= Dworcowa Street =

Street in Bydgoszcz, Poland

Coordinates: 53°07′49″N 17°59′47″E

Dworcowa Street in Bydgoszcz
Bydgoszcz
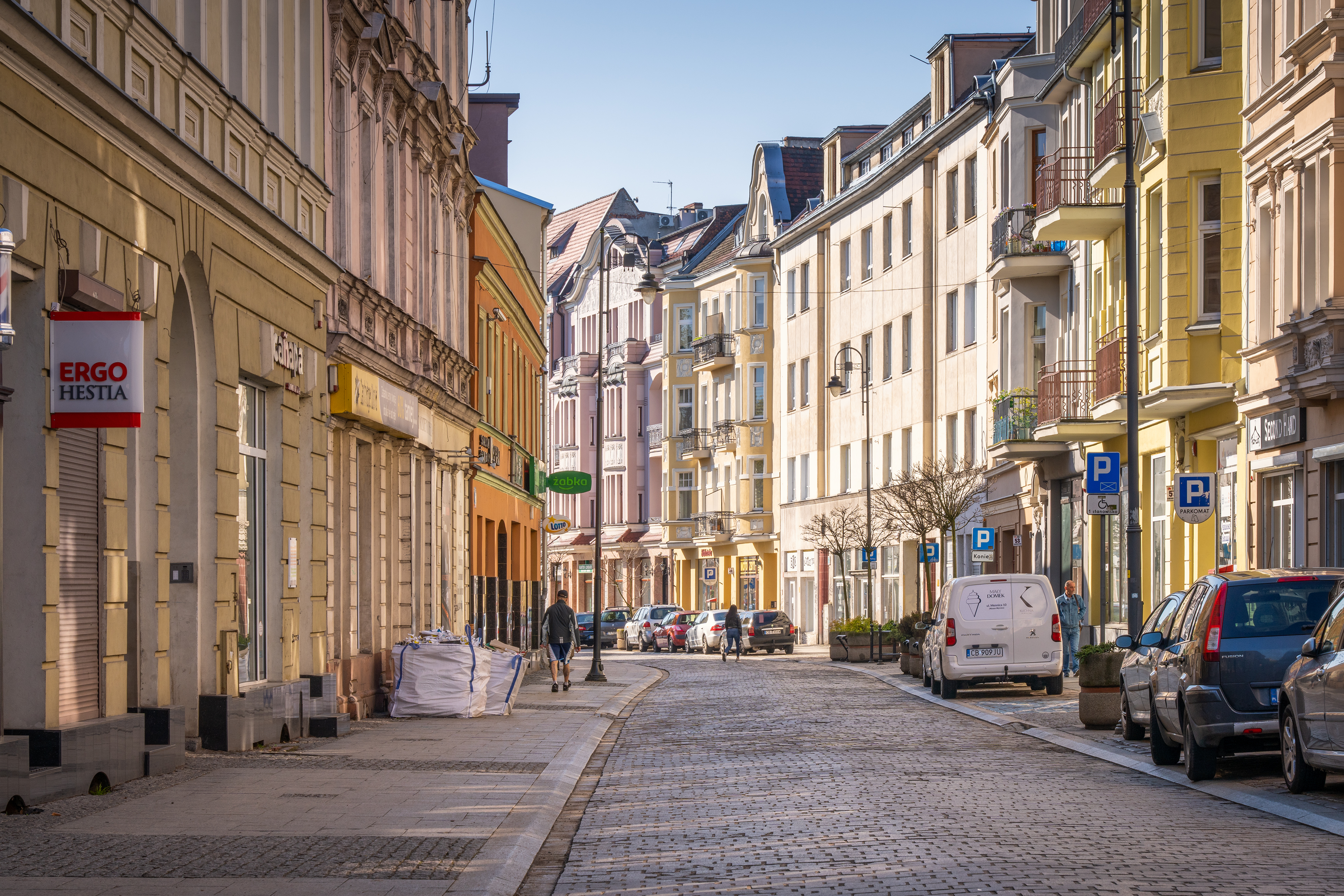
- View of the renovated facades

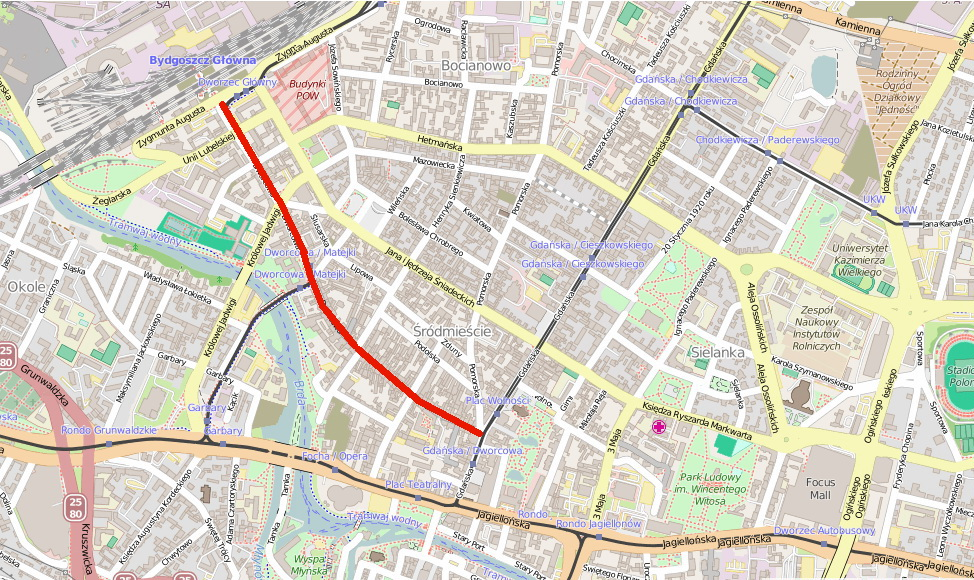
- Native name: Ulica Dworcowa w Bydgoszczy (Polish)
- Former name: Bahnhofstraße - Dworcowa - Albert-Forsterstraße
- Namesake: Main Station
- Owner: City of Bydgoszcz
- Length: 1.24 km (0.77 mi)
- Area: Downtown district
- Location: Bydgoszcz, Poland

Dworcowa Street is one of the main streets of Bydgoszcz, in Downtown district (Polish: Śródmieście). Many of its buildings are registered on the Kuyavian-Pomeranian Voivodeship Heritage List.

Across the street, between Warmia and Marcinkowskiego street runs the 18°E longitude Meridian, so-called Bydgoszcz Meridian.

== Location ==
The street is located in the western part of Downtown Bydgoszcz. It runs from the intersection with Gdanska Street to the intersection with Sigismund Augustus Street, where is the main train station, Bydgoszcz Główna. Hence its name: 'Train station' in Polish is Dworzec.

== History ==
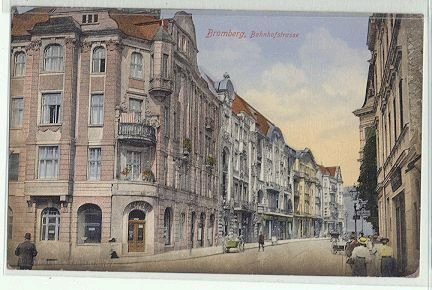
"Bahnhoffstraße Nr.41" in 1914

Until 1851, the path was a dirty road leading from Bydgoszcz to Koronowo. The development of the street is associated with the building of Bydgoszcz Main Railway Station in 1851, which led to assimilating the close settlement of Bocianowo (German: Brenkenhoff) into the city precinct.

On an 1861 map of the area, the vicinity of the railway station shows dispersed housings: it is only in the early 20th century that compact constructions make their appearance along the street. Some specific quarters near Gdanska street and close to the Main station have shown earlier activity, with the development of hotel buildings:

- Hotel "Pod Orlem" (1893), Hotel Pawlikowski (1898) in Gdanska Street;
- Hotel du Nord (1875), Heises's Hotel (1884), Schliep's Hotel (1889) near the Main Station.

At the end of the 19th century, Dworcowa street had an industrial and commercial character. In its surroundings flourished trade houses, craft workshops and restaurants or bars. The industrial buildings and warehouses occupied the area between the street and the Brda river, while along the street were located flats and shops. The largest companies at then Bahnhofstraße were:

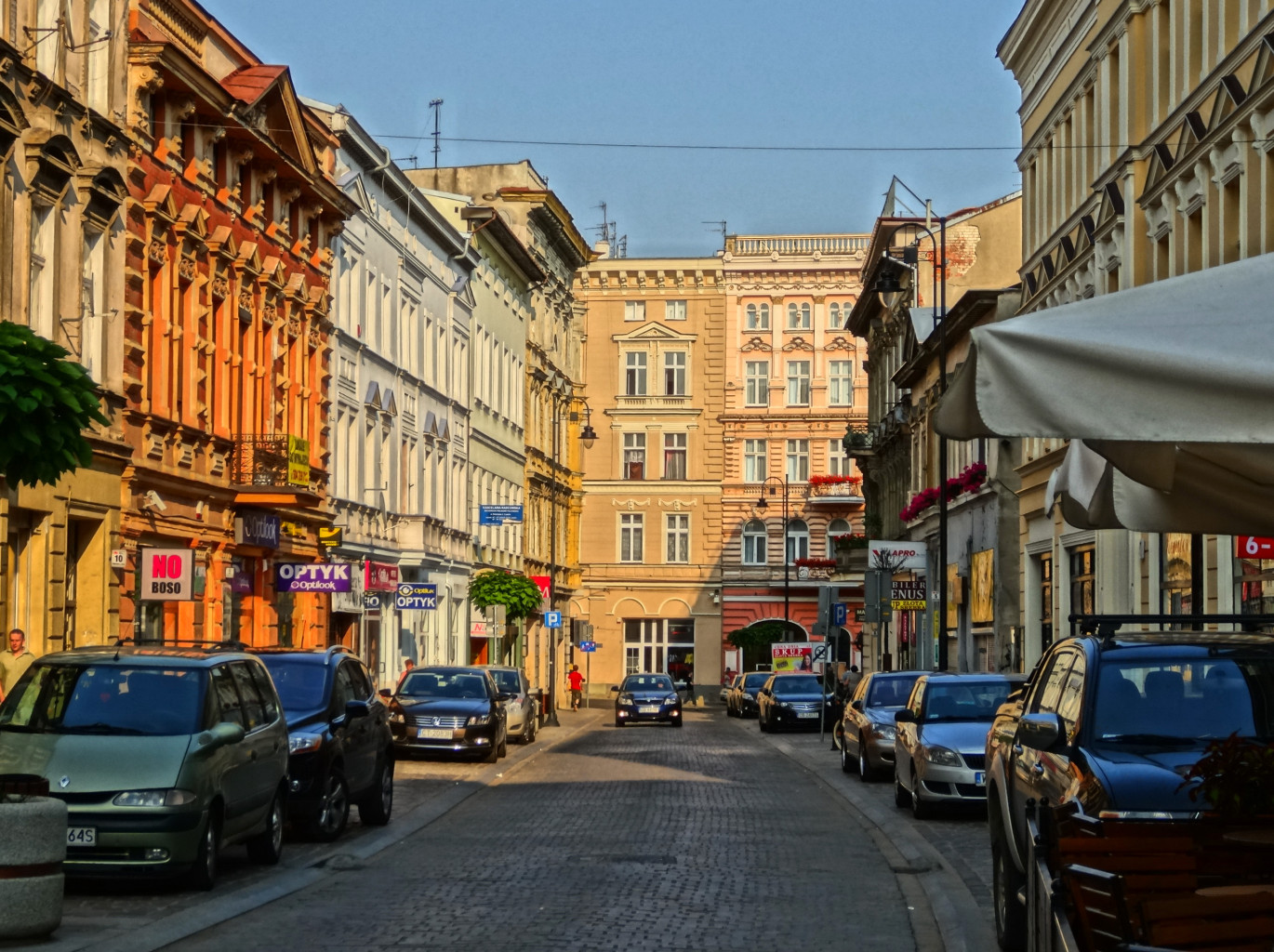
Eastern tip of Dworcowa Street

- Fabryka Sygnałów Kolejowych ('Railway Signals Factory');
- J. G. Neumann Brick Factory (German: Ziegelfabrik);
- Printhouse Ortis (established by Hermann and Emil Dittmann); they published the Deutsche Rundschau, and after World War II all the local newspapers.

Between 1890 and 1914, many houses along the street have been transformed into 3 to 4 storey buildings, displaying ornated facades (e.g. building at Nr. 55, decorated with a head of Hermes), turning the venue into one of the most representative in the city. In the final section of the street near the Main Railway Station, there used to stand five hotels, furnished as tenements.

Street trams have been operated since 1888, first horse powered, then electrical ones in 1896. The line (Red) ran along the entire length of the street from the station to Gdańska Street.

In 1990, tram traffic has been suspended for technical reasons. Since then a partial restoration of the line has been performed after the revitalization of the street.

Through history, this street had the following names:

- 1852–1920: Bahnhofstraße ('Main Station Street' in German);
- 1920–1939: Ulica Dworcowa;
- 1939–1945: Albert-Forsterstrasse (named after nazi leader Albert Forster);
- From 1945: Ulica Dworcowa.

== Characteristics ==
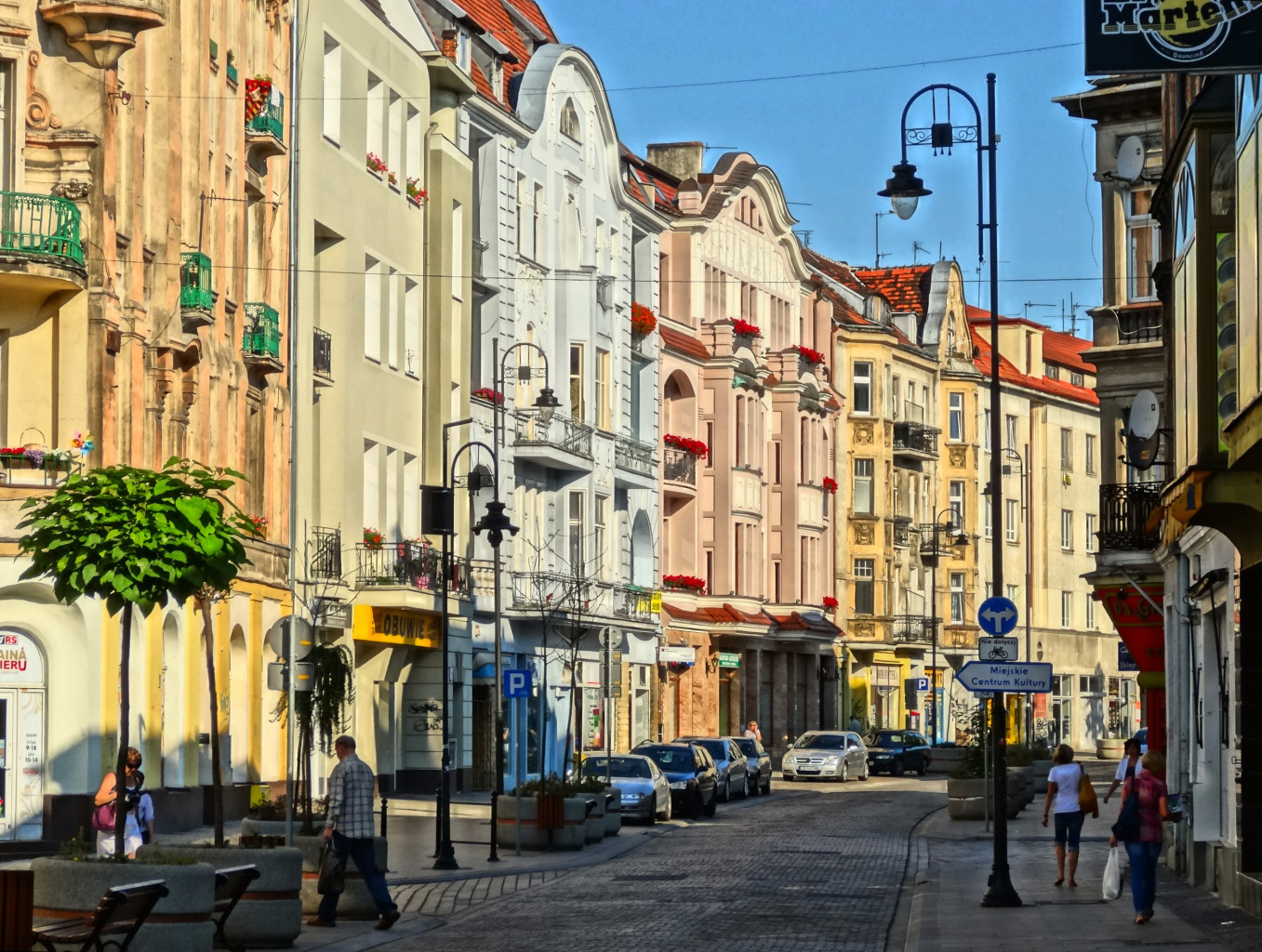
At the intersection with Sienkiewicza street

Dworcowa Street is 1242 m long and is almost entirely built with stylish houses. It is considered as one of the most important thoroghfares, historically and functionally, in downtown Bydgoszcz. Its architectural landscape is quite diverse, with houses of different scale and style coexisting together.

For the most part, street facades display architectural features fashionable in the years 1860–1914:

- Eclecticism
- Neo-Renaissance
- Neo-Baroque
- Secession
- Modern

The oldest buildings were built in Neoclassical style, usually with simple, symmetrical facades and modest decorations. During the last quarter of the 19th century, elements of Neo-Renaissance, Neo-Gothic and Neo-Baroque start to appear on houses. Most impressive buildings have been erected between 1900 and 1915: it was the emergence of breaking architectural styles, such as Historicism, Secession and early Modern architecture.

The Prussian Eastern Railway Headquarters has been erected in the late 1880s, and was at the time the most magnificent public property in the entire city.

Dworcowa street has been the playground of many local and Berlin's architects. However, past major bydgoszcz designers, Joseph Święcicki and Fritz Weidner who built 29 edifices in Gdanska Street, only designed four buildings in Dworcowa.

Most noticeable tenements are located on the southern side of the street: three buildings have been registered on the Heritage List since 2010.

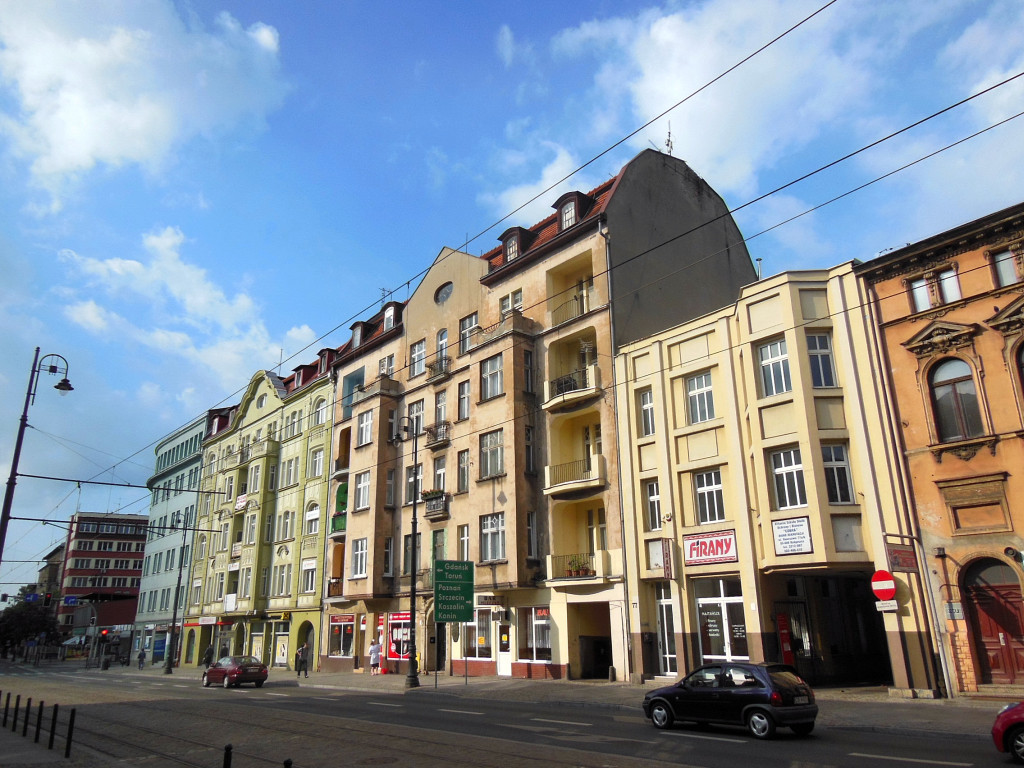
View in the vicinity of the train station

Most prominent buildings include:

- Former Prussian Eastern Railway Headquarters;
- State Archives Building at 65;
- Tax House at Warminskiego 18;
- Hotels
  - Former "Asystenta at 79;
  - Centralny at 85;
  - Hotel Brda (built in 1968-1972).

== Revitalisation ==
Dworcowa Street being one of the most important streets in downtown Bydgoszcz, it has been identified to be the target of a vast revitalisation plan.

In 2009, in the Local Plan for the Revitalization of Bydgoszcz has been included the project Revitalisation of Dworcowa street. Costs amount to 6.4 million PLN, supported by a 4.2 million PLN EU funding under the 2007-2013 Regional Operational Programme for Kuyavian-Pomeranian Voivodeship.

The project encompassed:

- the modernization of Dworcowa street with a pedestrian pavement;
- the addition of green areas;
- the landscaping on the section between Gdanska Street and Matejki street.

In addition, the section leading from Matejki street to Main Railway Station has seen the restoration of tram circulation and the refurbishment of a historic building by Fritz Weidner in the immediate vicinity, converted to a Municipal Cultural Center.

== Means of transportation ==
Since 2012, tram lines Nr.5 and 8 run on the section from Matejki street to Sigismund Augustus street, using a special bridge built for the occasion.

In addition, bus lines (54, 67, 75, 71, 79, 80, 83, 84, 31N, 33N) run on the section between the train station and Królowej Jadwigi street.

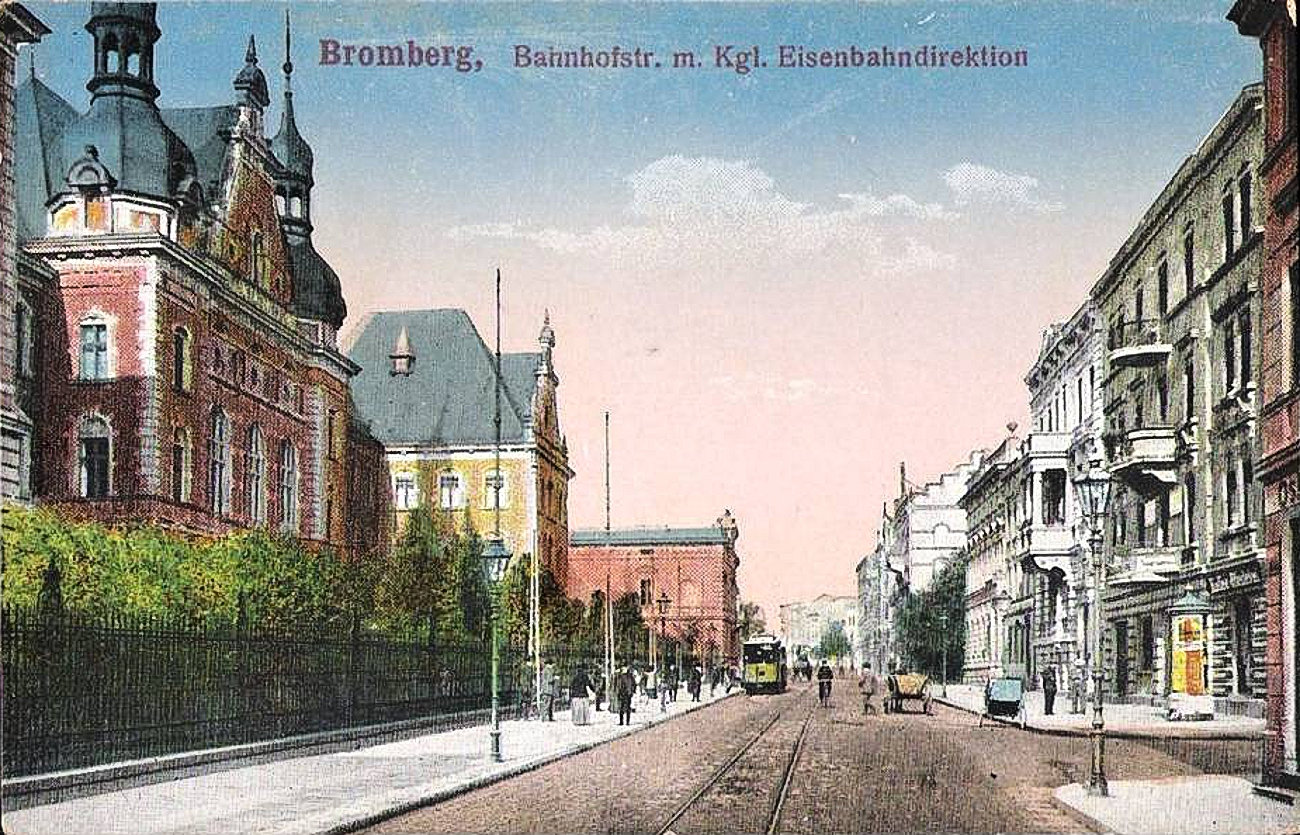
Tram in Dworcowa street, c. 1910

== Main edifices ==
=== Department store "Jedynak", crossing with 15 Gdańska Street ===
Registered on Kuyavian-Pomeranian Voivodeship heritage list, Nr.601296-reg.87/A, December 10, 1971

1910–1911, by Otto Walter

Modern Architecture

One of the first Department Store built in then Bromberg, it pioneered the use of reinforced concrete in a modern design.

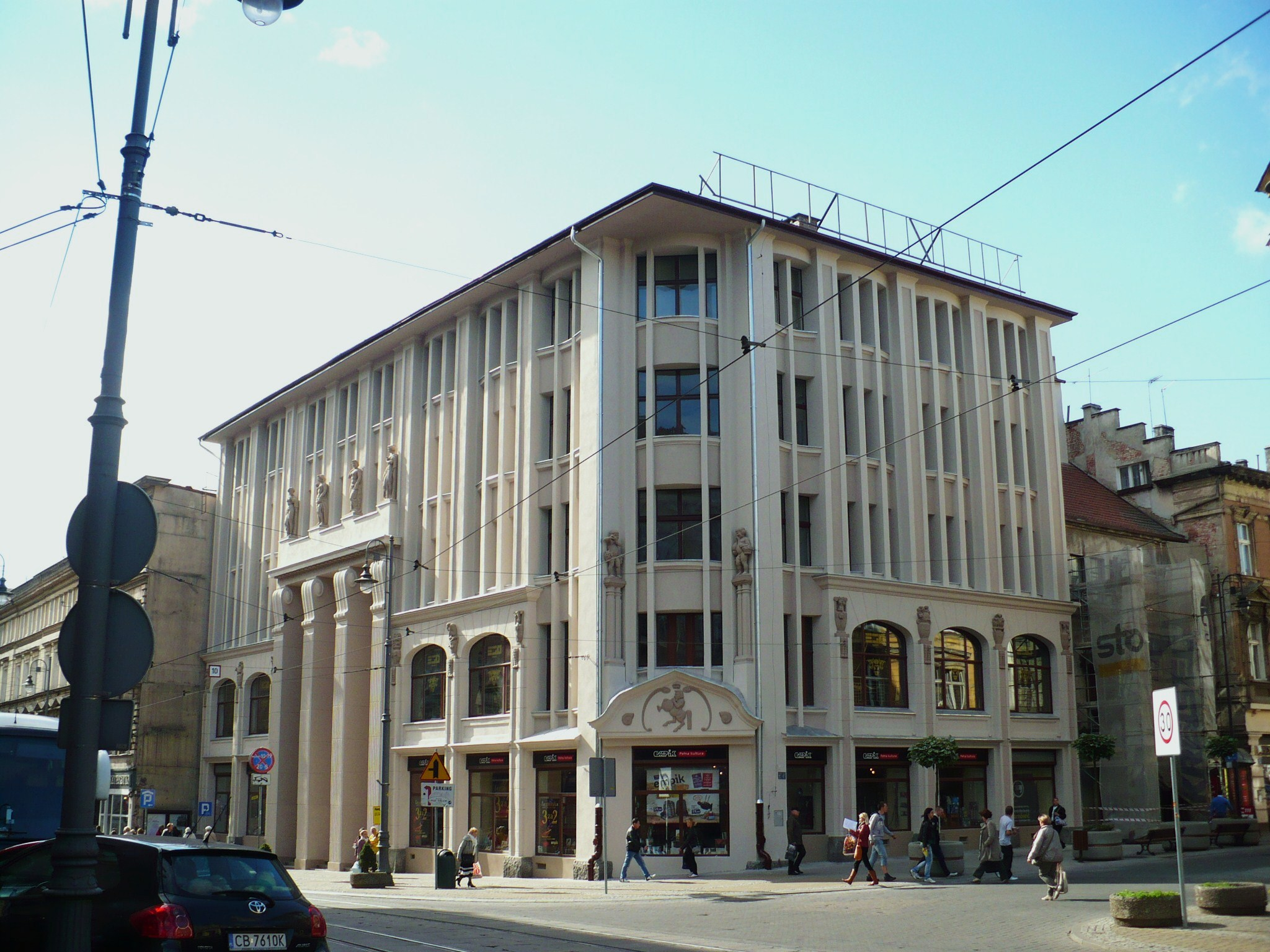
Department Store "Jedynak"

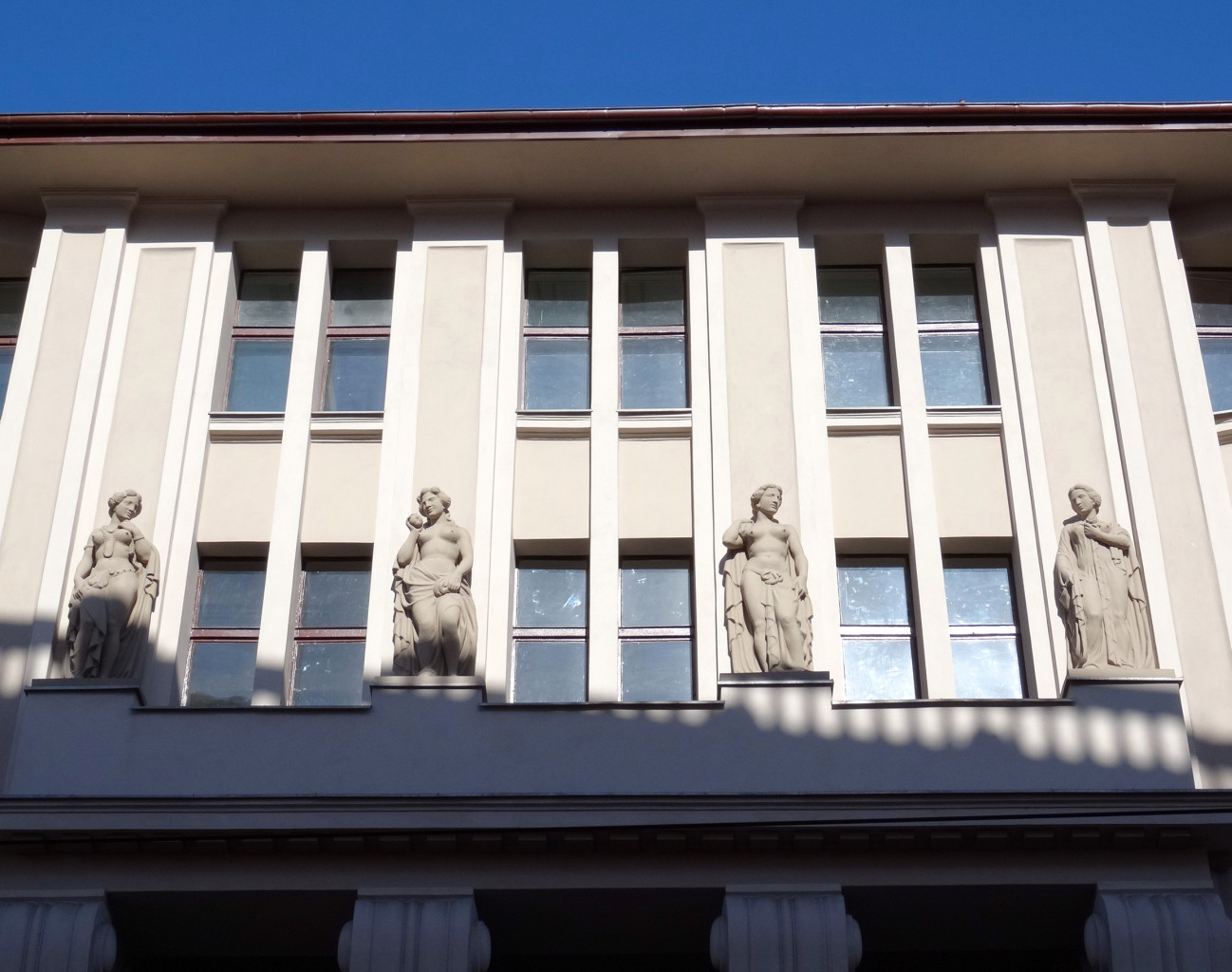
Allegories on the facade

=== Tenement at 2 corner with 1 Pomorska Street ===
1884, by Karl Bergner

Eclecticism

This corner house has been commissioned by Mr Jäfel, a lithograph. In 1908, a drugstore run by Dr Aurel Kratz opened there: it was also selling goods for cameras until World War I. Aurel Kratz then moved to Friedrichstraße.

The building has a triangular footprint plot, a challenge for the designer. It displays a nice bay window on the corner facade. The first floor windows, around the bay-window are more adorned than others with flanking pilasters topped with corbels and a frieze of ornaments. Second floors windows are capped by triangular pediments and have also small corbels and pilasters. Third level openings are only flanked by lean pilasters and pediment topped. A line of designed corbels runs beneath the roof.

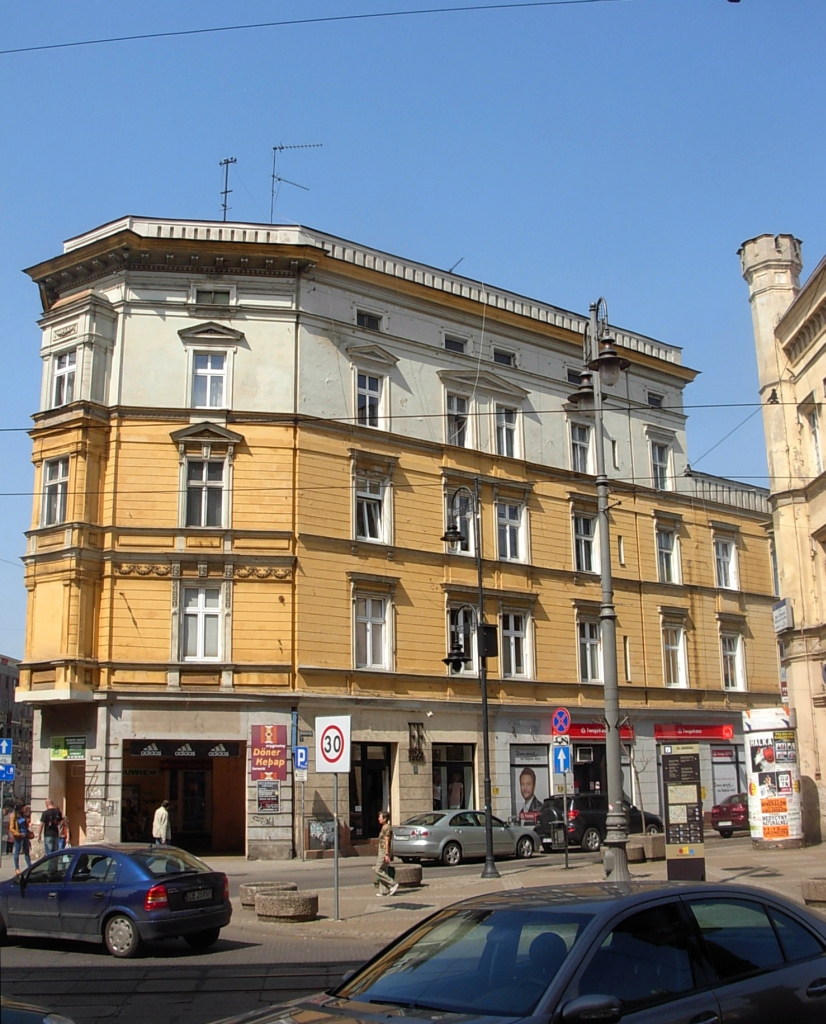
Facade onto Pomorska Street

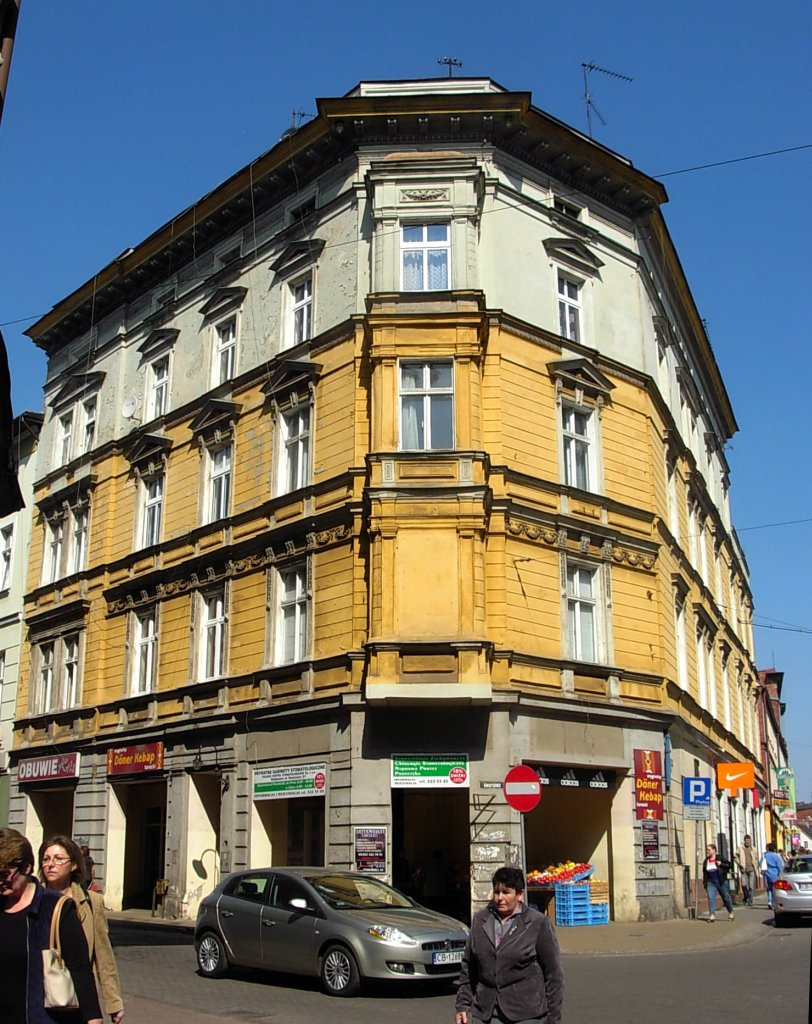
View from Gdańska Street

=== Tenement at 3 ===
1893–1894, by Carl Stampehl

Historicism

Eduard Merres, an instrument craftsman for surgery, nursery and optics, was the first owner of the house, then located at Bahnhofstraße 2. In 1907, the new owner was Mr. Conitzer, a businessman member of the very family running at that time the neighbouring department store.

The facade has been restored in 2015, giving more sharpness to all the different details. It is almost a classical one, but for the asymmetry: on first level, one notices heavily adorned windows (triangle pediments, pilasters with consoles), the second floor is less decorated and topped by a dense Corbel table. The gate axis is stressed by a monumental balcony and a smaller one above. The entry door transom light is crowned by a delicately carved female figure.

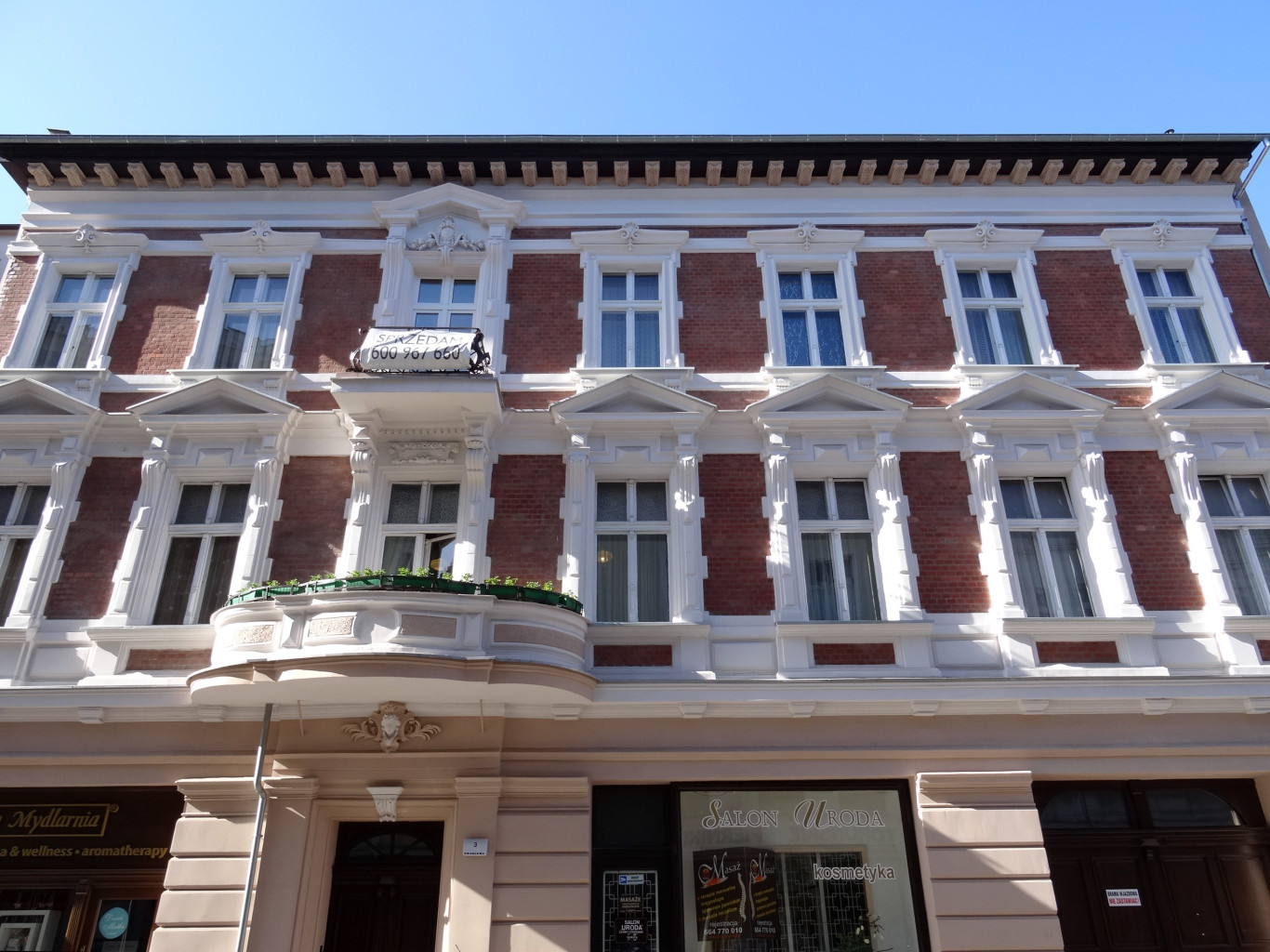
Main elevation

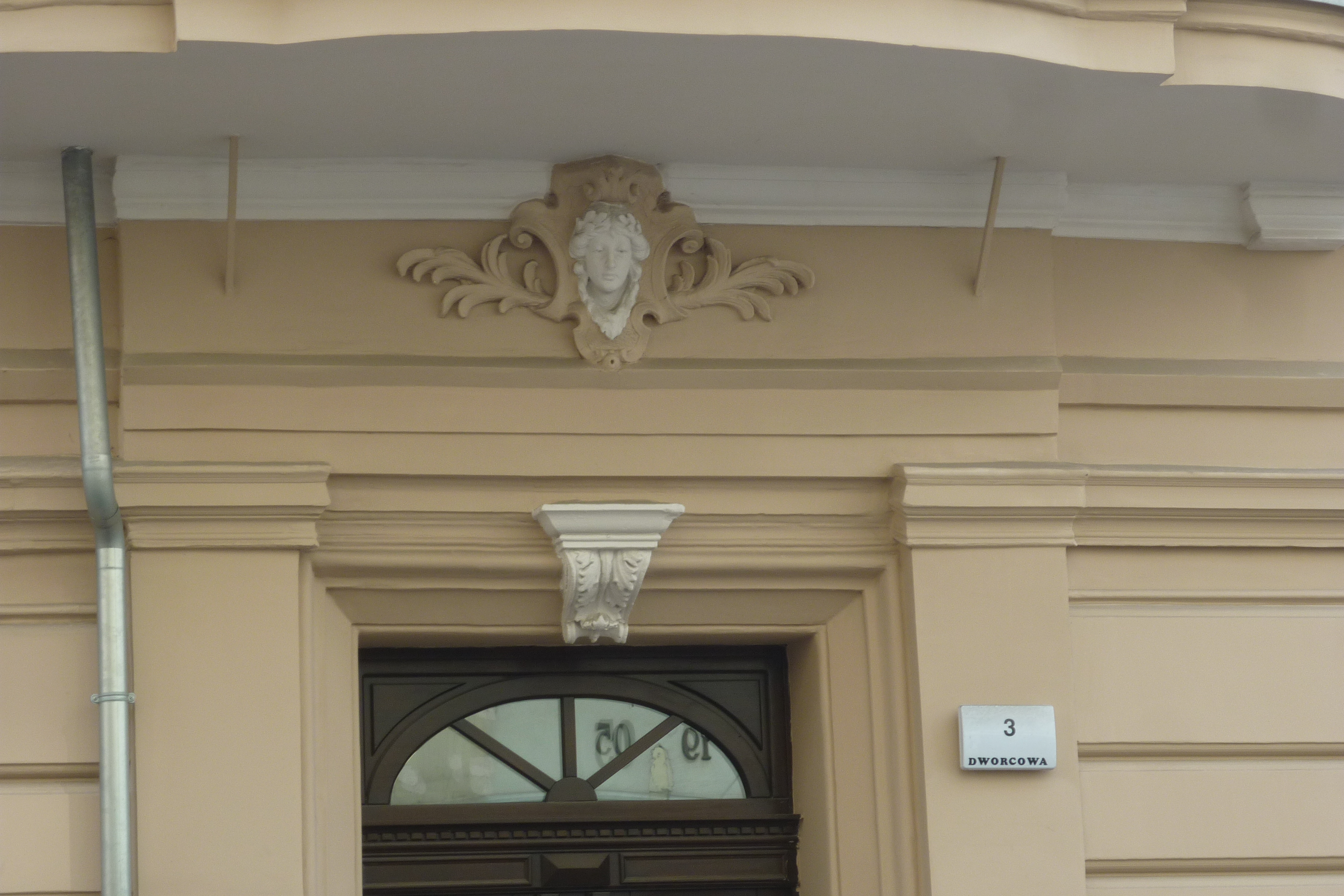
Detail of the transom

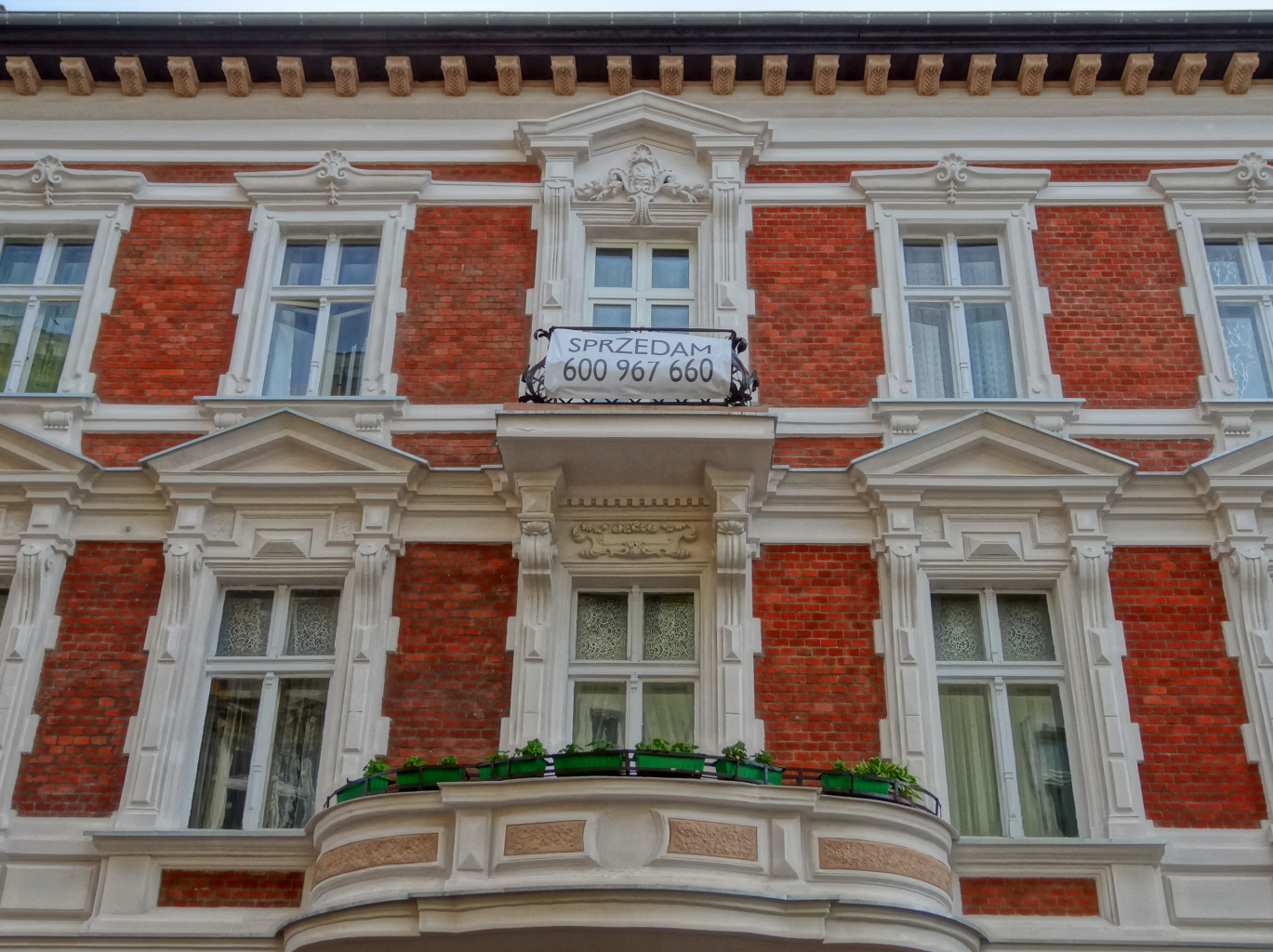
Detail of balconies

=== Tenement at 4 ===
1887, by Józef Święcicki and Anton Hoffmann

Eclecticism

Julius and Herß Krojanter, were the first owners of the house at Bahnhofstraße 97: they were cereals merchants and had their counter in the building. In the 1920s, the tenement housed a kitchenware shop, "A. Hensel".

The facade lost all its original adornments during renovation. However, the row of square windows on the top witnesses the original Neoclassical features.

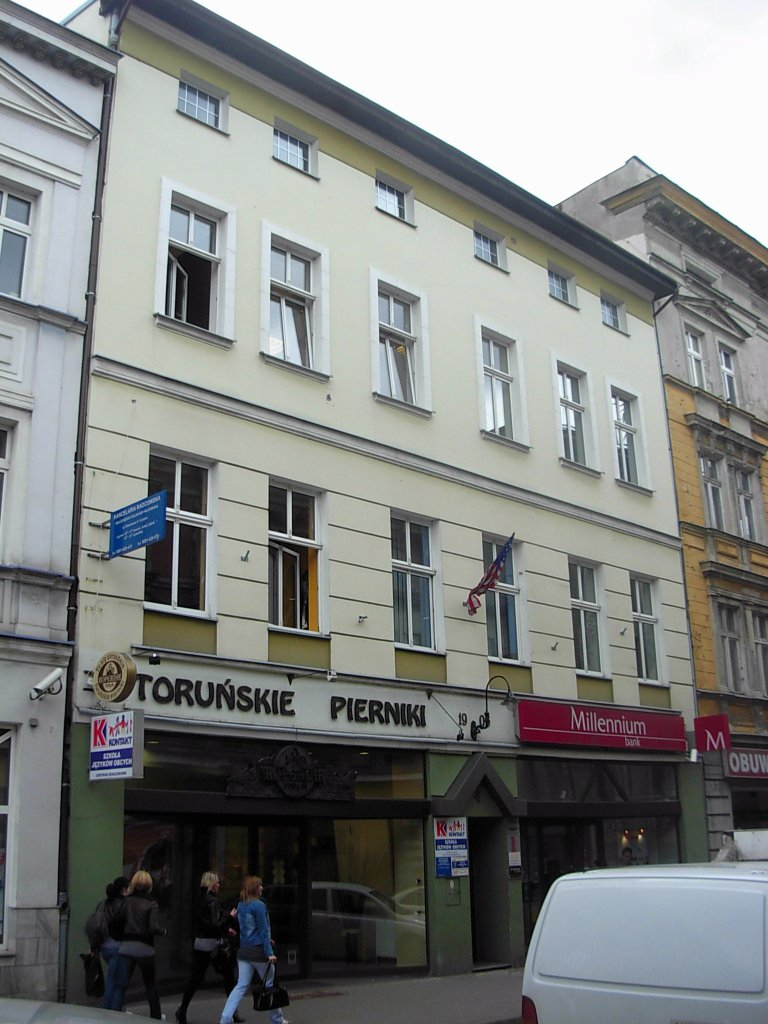
Facade on Dworcowa Street

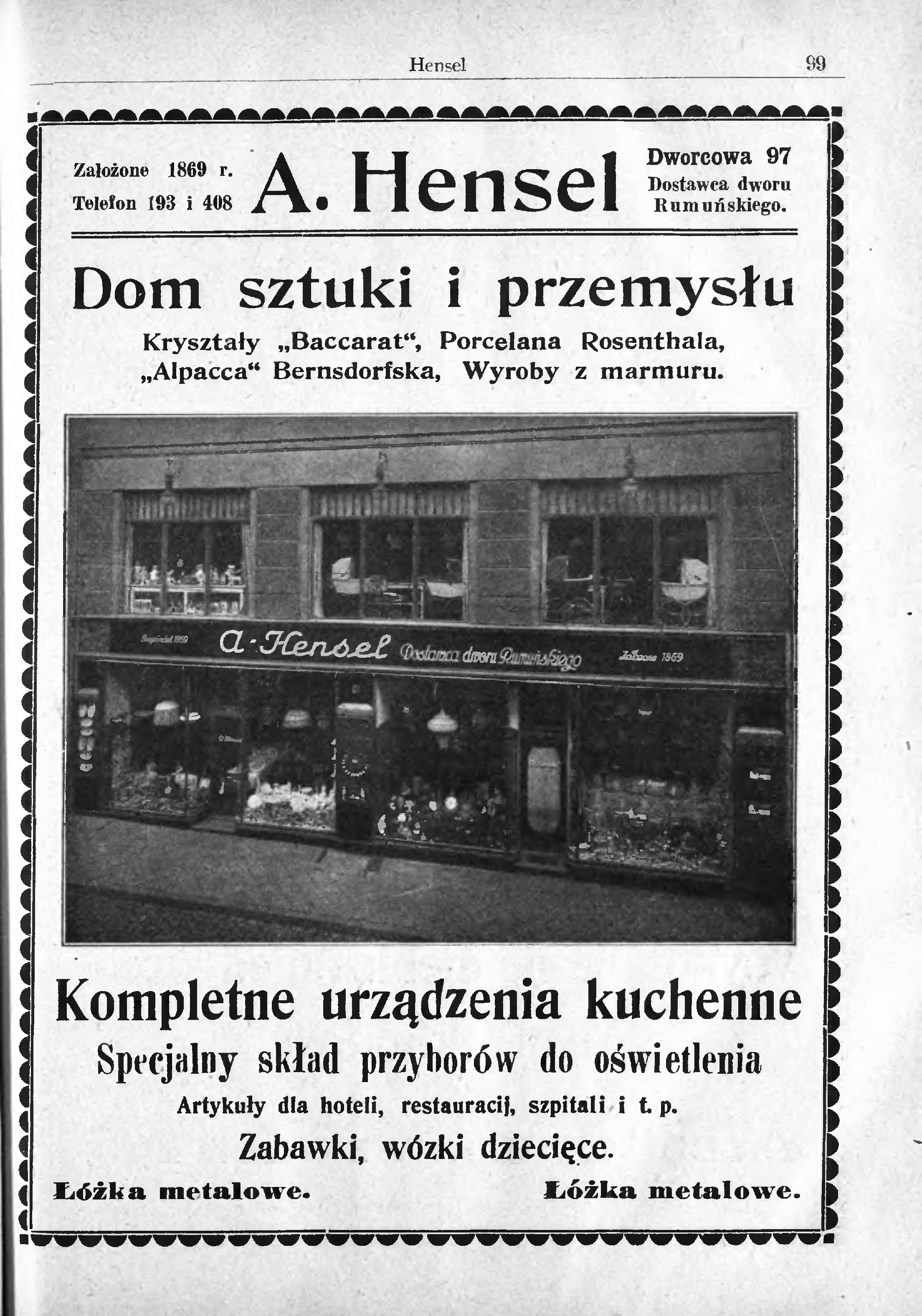
Advertising for "A. Hensel" shop (1925)

=== Tenement at 5 ===
Mid-19th century

Eclecticism

Amelie Sieg, a rentier and widow of a mason, was the first owner of the tenement in the 1870s. From the 1900s (decade) until World War I, the new owner, Ernst Knitter, was a merchant selling kitchenware and ironmongery.

The elevation has been renovated in 2015, underlying the delicacy of the ornamentation: the front pediment, the gate frame with its two facing figures, the pilasters and the corbel table.

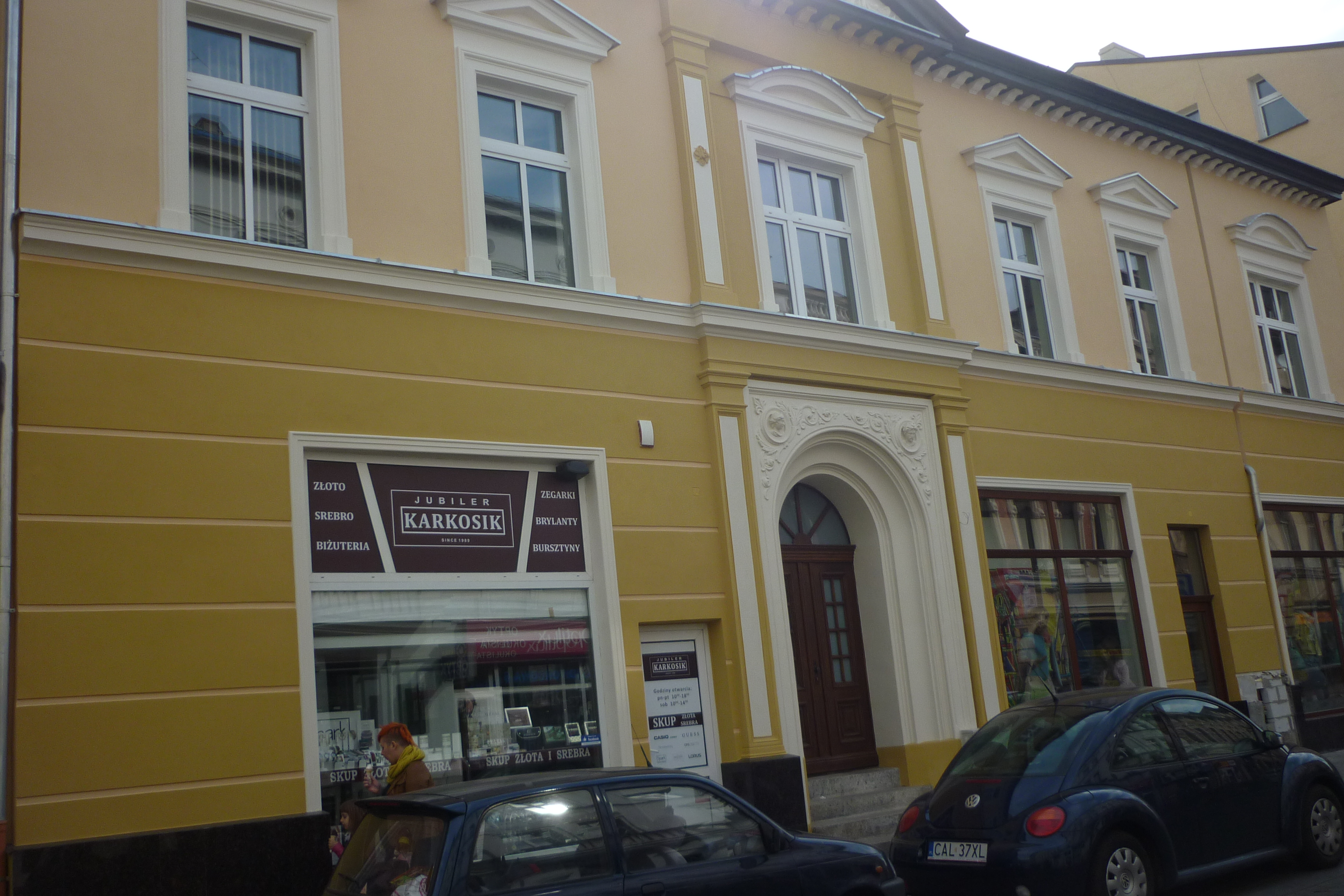
Main elevation

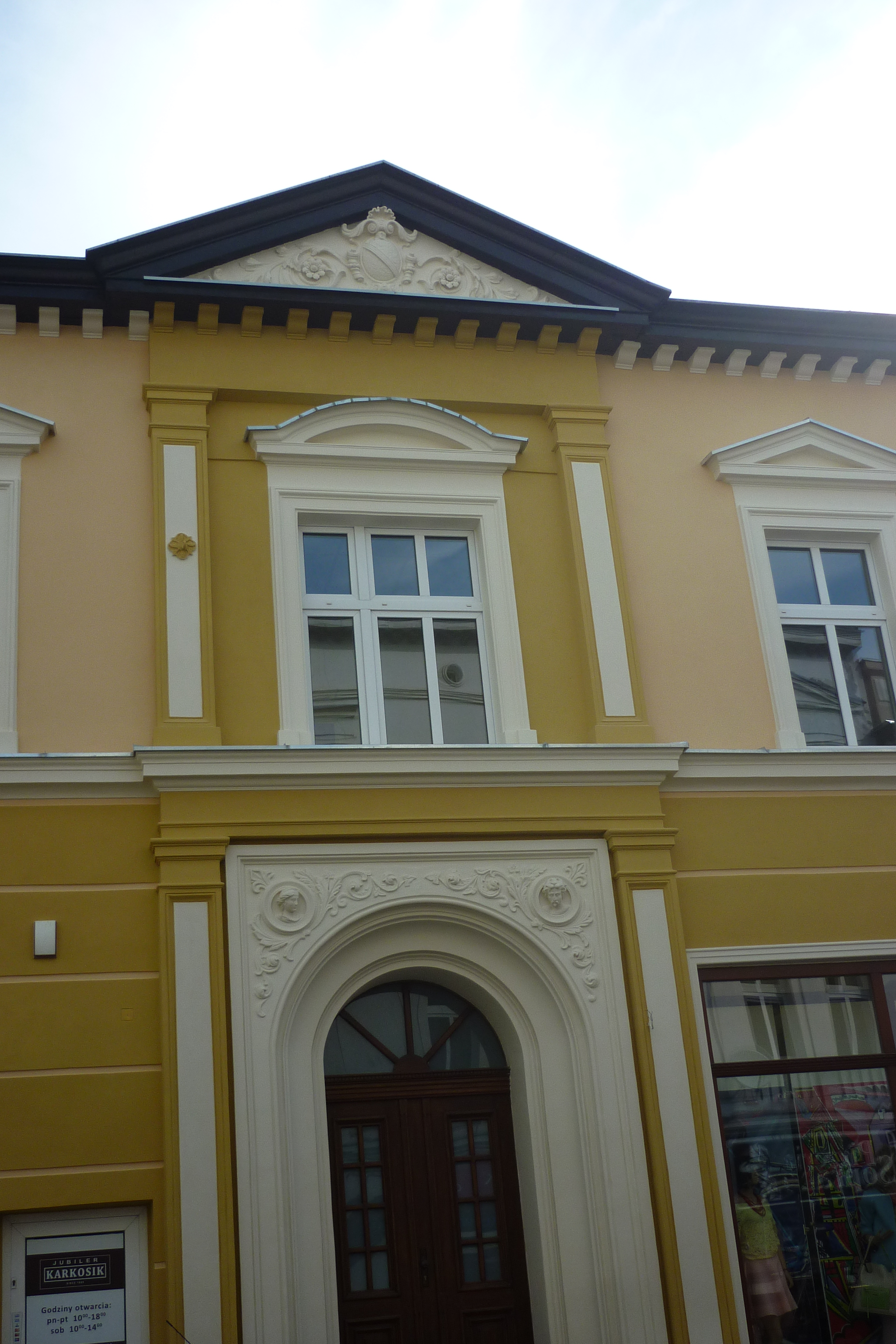
Detail of the facade

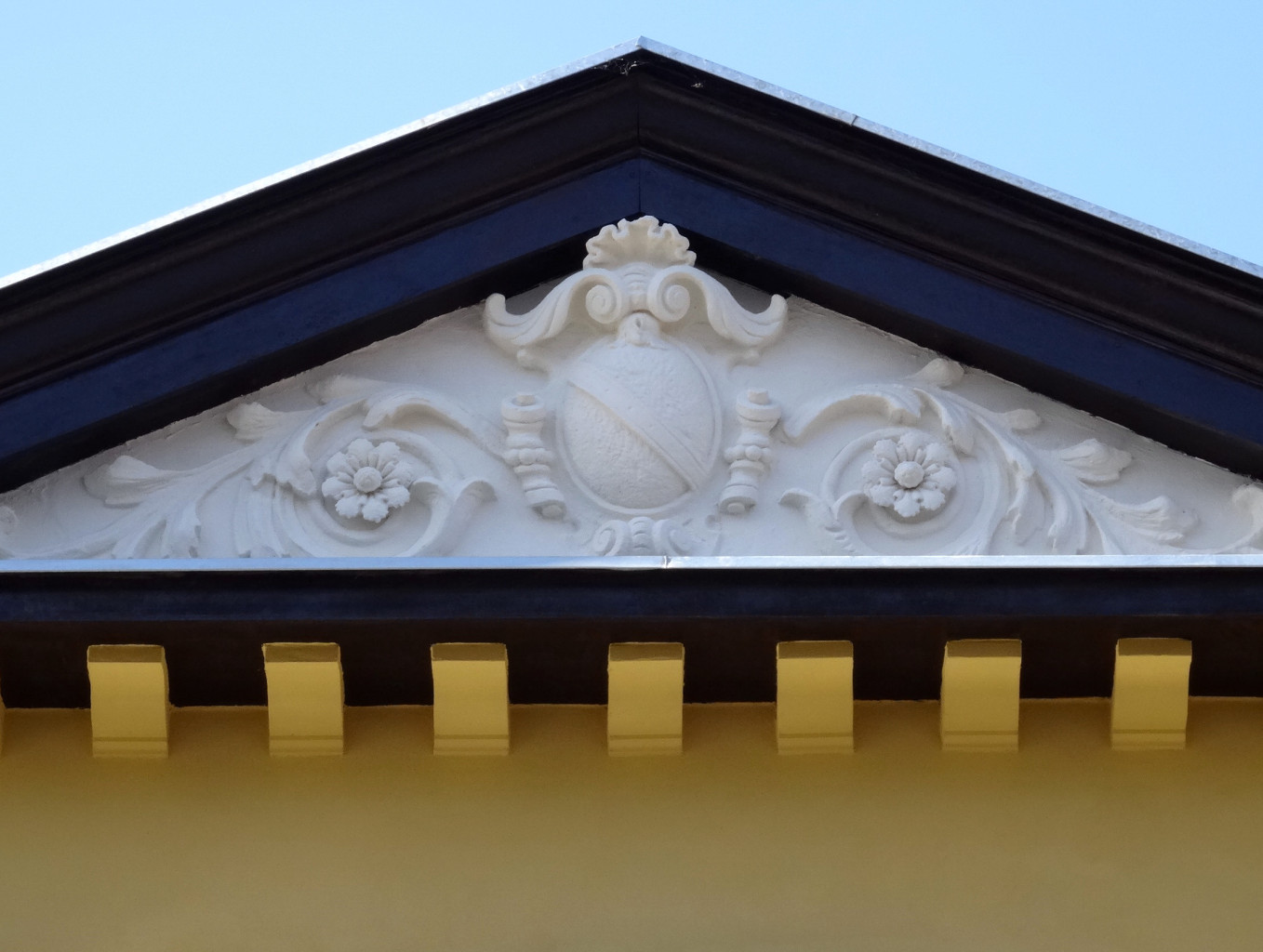
View of the main pediment

=== Tenement at 6 ===
ca 1875-1900

Neoclassicism

A baker, Wilhelm ßiehl, was the first landlord of the house in 1869, which address was then Bahnhofstraße 96. He lived there until the start of World War I.

The facade displays Neoclassical elements: symmetry, smooth wall, ornamented windows for each floor, small openings at the top of the elevation, topped with a corbel table, and a small stone balcony.

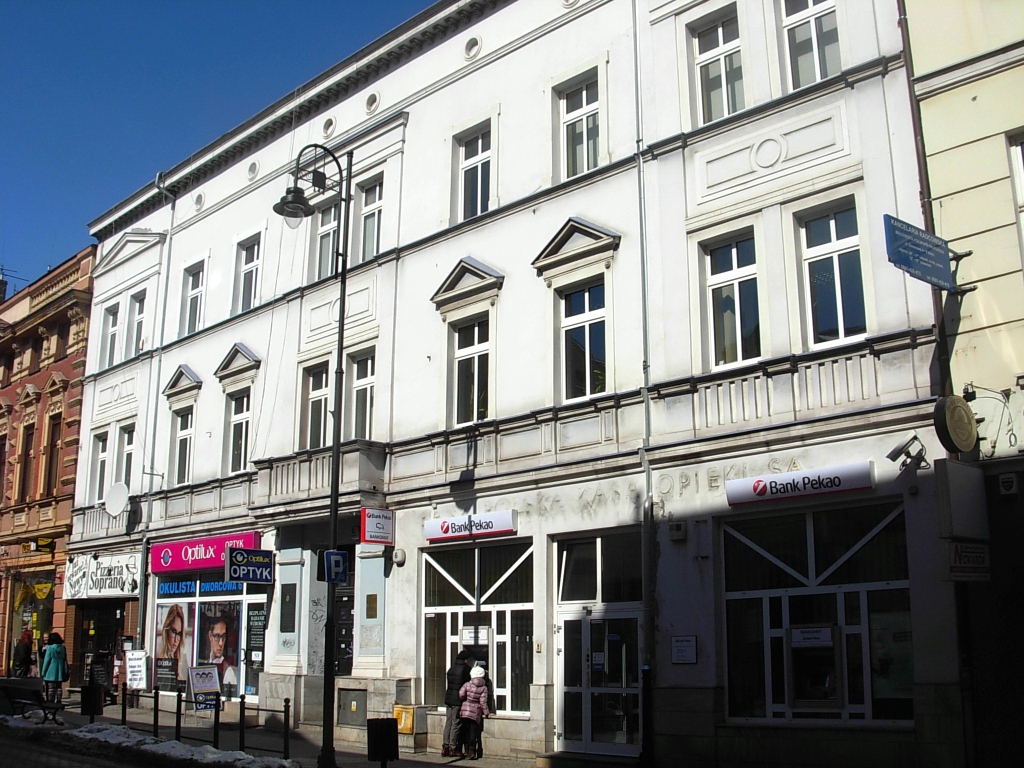
Facade on Dworcowa Street

=== Tenement at 7 ===
ca 1875-1900

Eclecticism & Neoclassicism

Gabriel Czalla was the first owner of the house at Bahnhofstraße 4.

The symmetrical facade lost its initial ornaments during the 20th century. However, one can still appreciate the overall disposition, with the slight avant-corps underlining the axis of the entry gate, flanked by high pilasters continuing to the first floor.

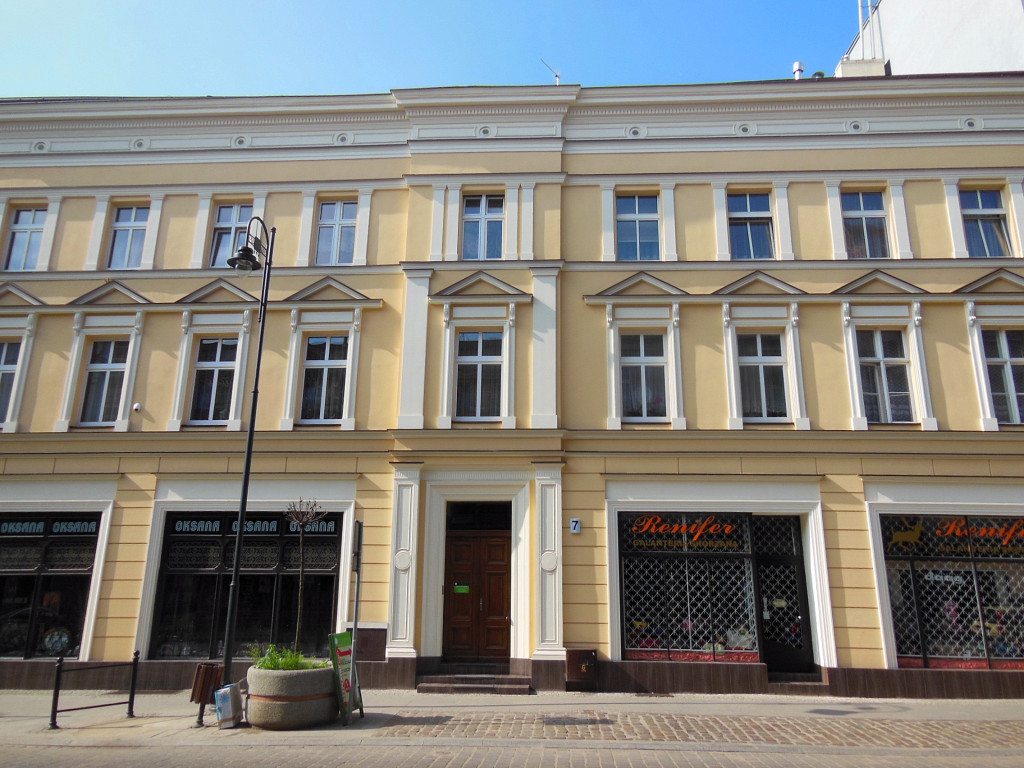
Facade on Dworcowa Street

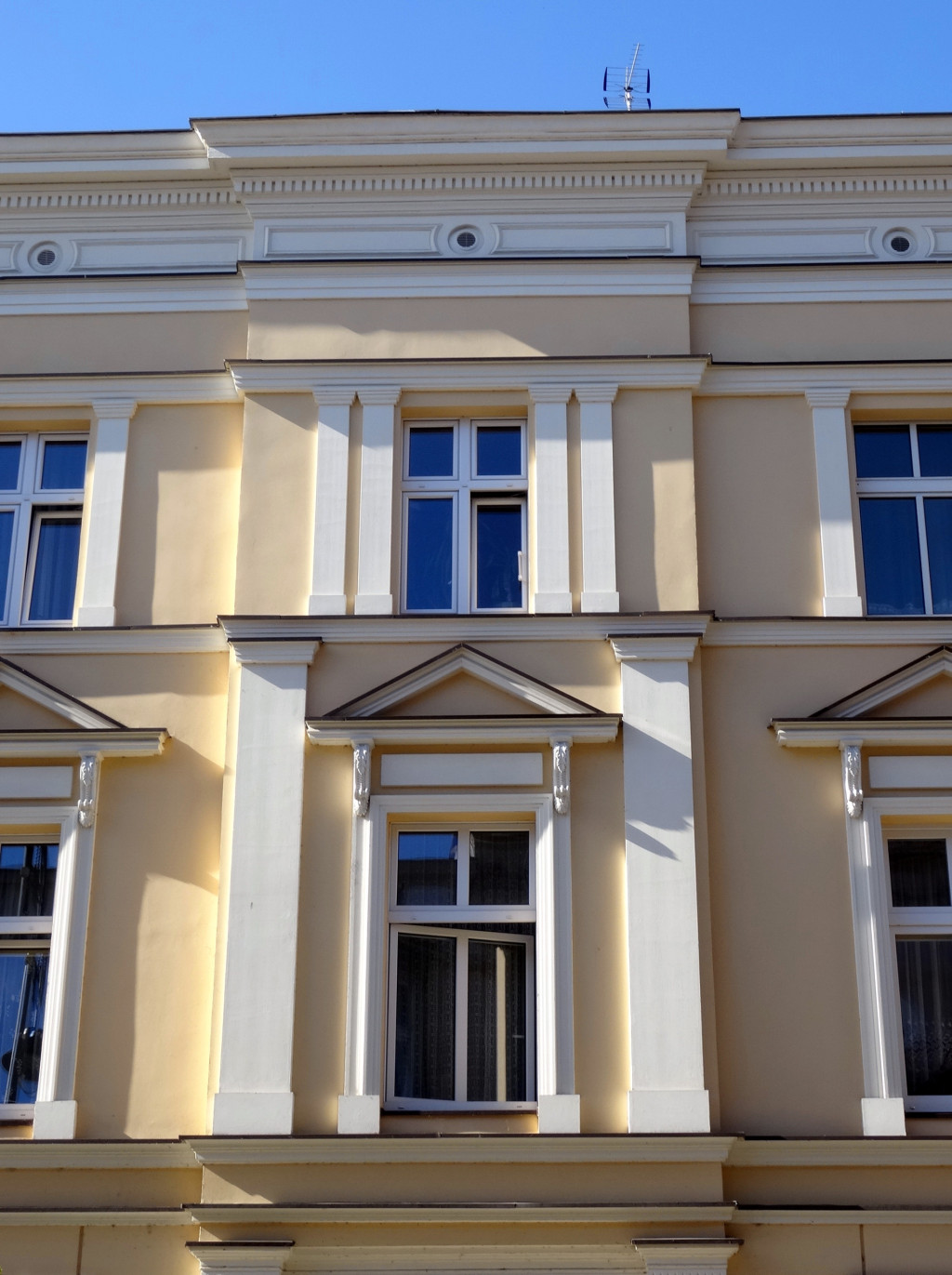
Detail of the avant-corps

=== Tenement at 10 ===
1885-1886

Neoclassicism

Initially registered at Bahnhofstraße 95, the first owner was a merchant, Gustav Wollenberg, who lived at today's Gdańska Street 12 (Danzigerstraße 164).

The facade has been rebuilt in 1935, the entire building refurbished in 2016. Nice motifs have been brought back to life, such as cartouches with mustached figures or ornaments on corbels and pediments.

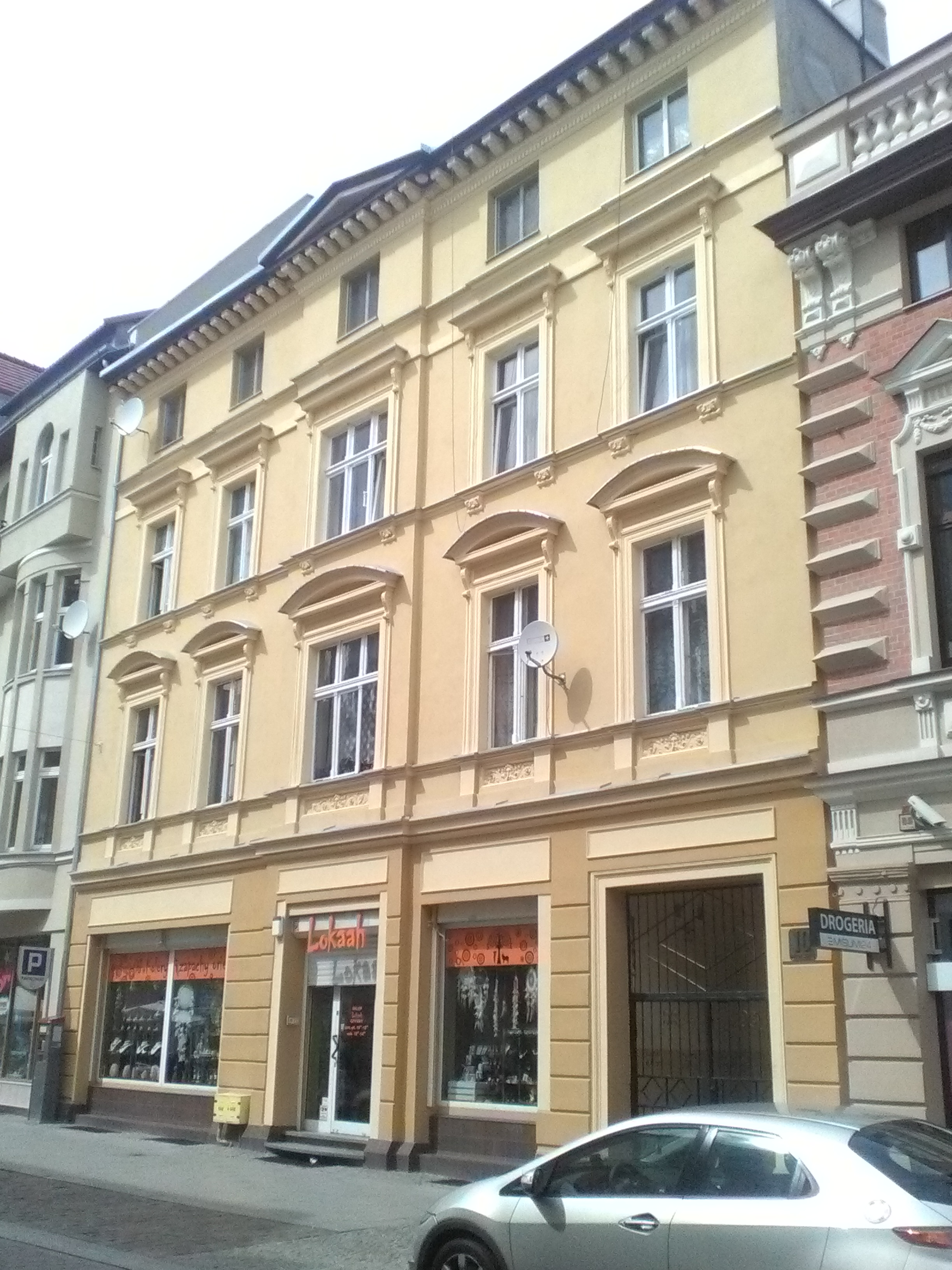
Main elevation onto Dworcowa Street

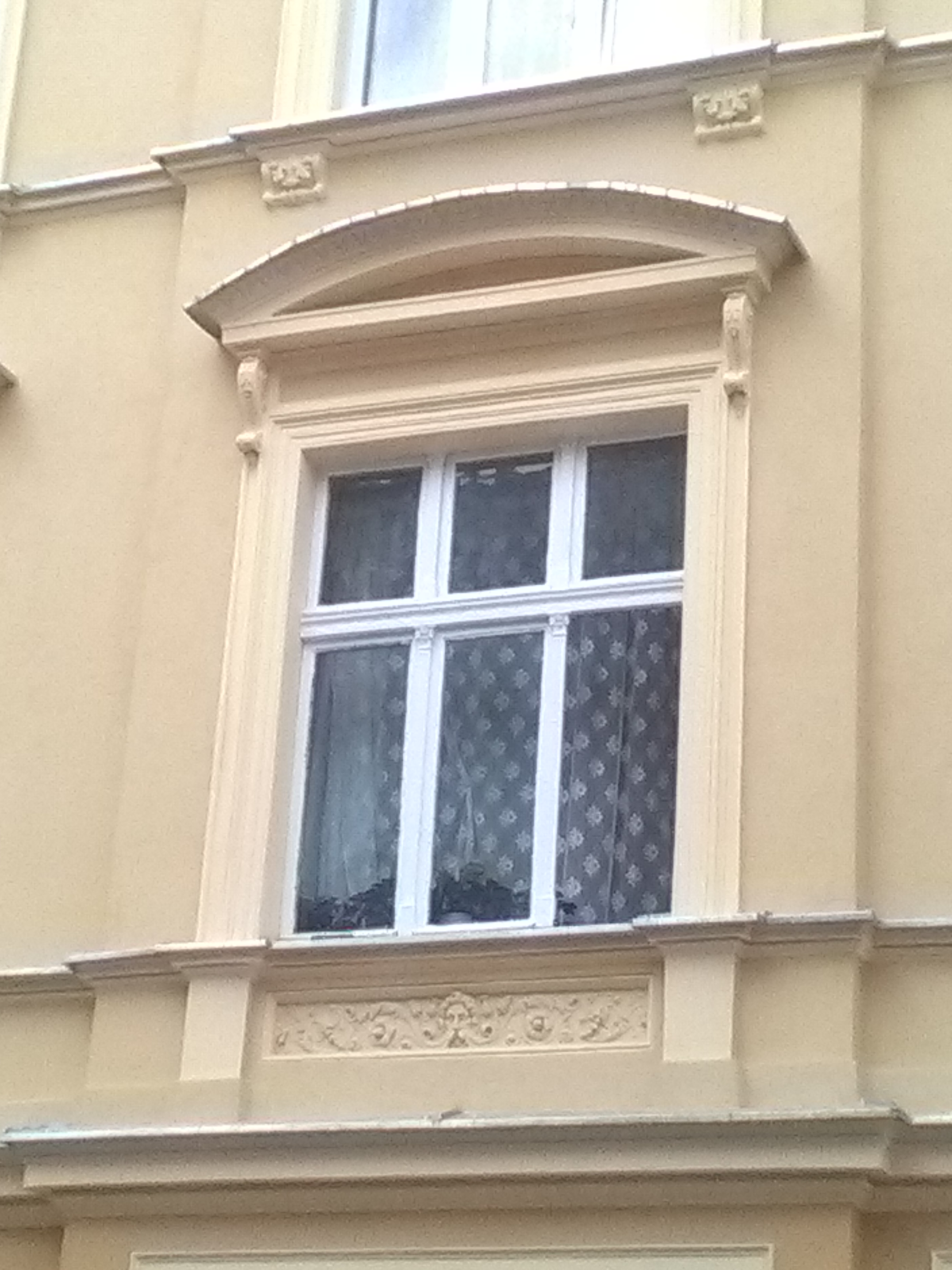
Window decoration

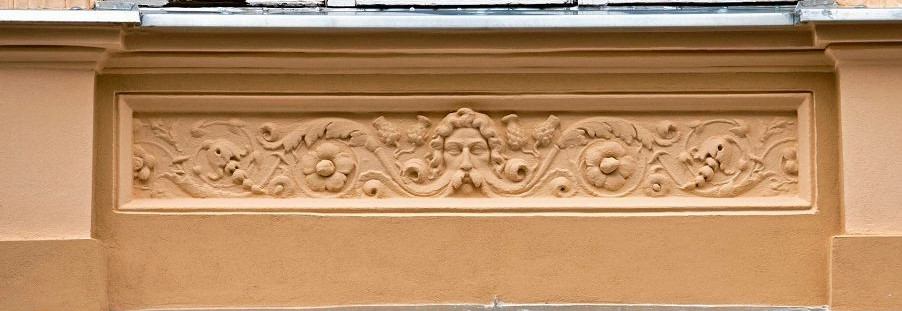
Detail of a cartouche

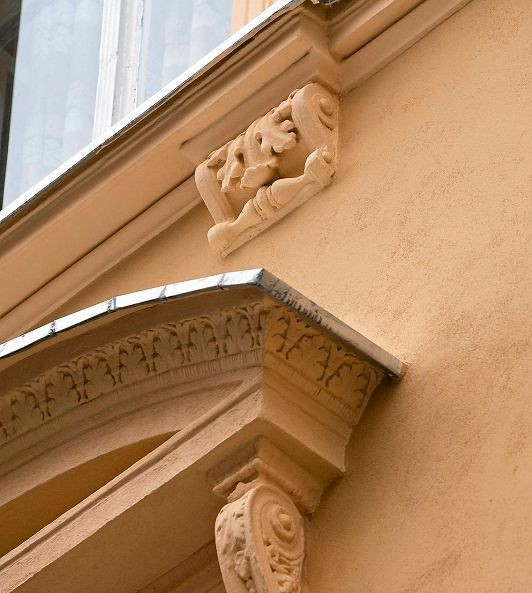
Ornament

=== Otto Pfefferkorn tenement at 12 ===
1909, by Fritz Weidner

Historicism

Otto Pfefferkorn owned a successful furniture factory in Bromberg, which still exists today. He had this tenement designed by Fritz Weidner, which comprised at the time almost 200 rooms. It was also used as one of its many selling points in the city (others were found at today's Gdańska Street, Theatre square, Podolska or Pestalozziego streets). He even opened branches in Warsaw or Katowice. In 1912, the building was awarded city most beautiful facade!

Most of the architectural details of the facade have unfortunately vanished. Be that as it may, one can make out the asymmetry of the elevation, characteristic of Fritz Weidner. He used bow windows unbalanced positions, balconies at different levels and with different shapes to reach his goals.

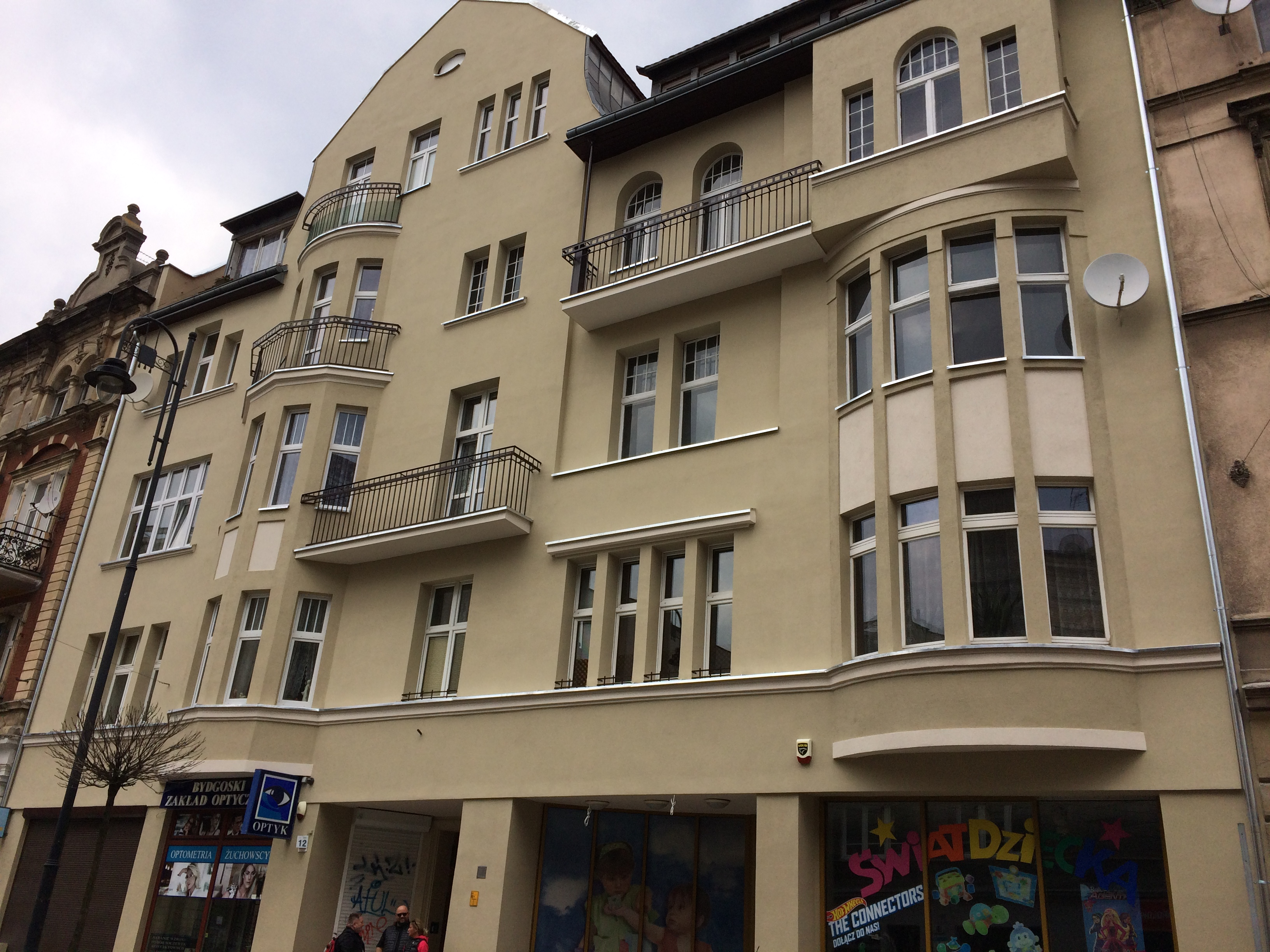
Facade on Dworcowa Street

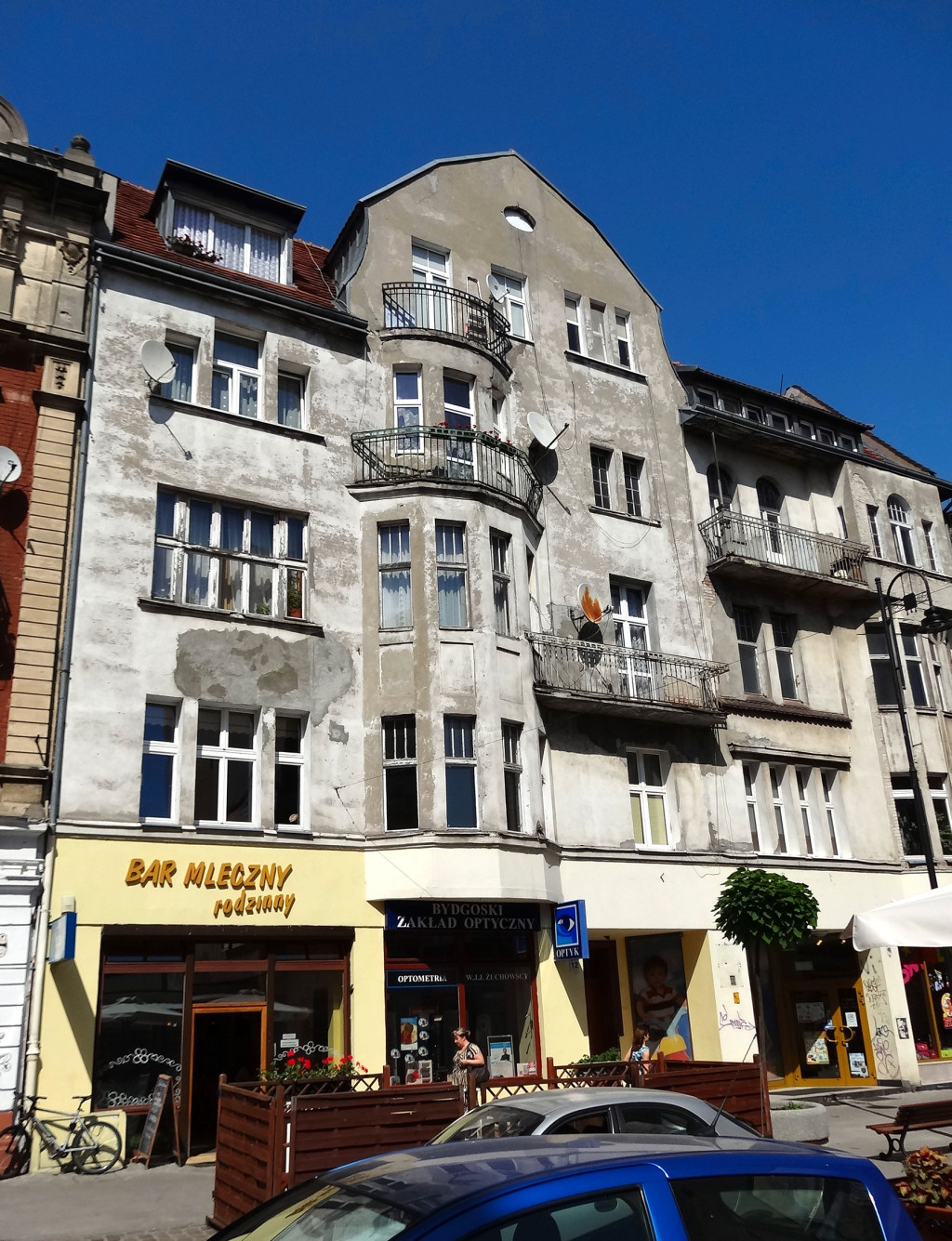
Facade before restoration

=== Apro building at 13 ===
2011, by Danuta Jarosewski

Modern architecture

The building has been realized within the frame of the revitalization of Dworcowa street. In the early 20th century, the plot was the site of a successful printhouse owned by A. Dittmann.

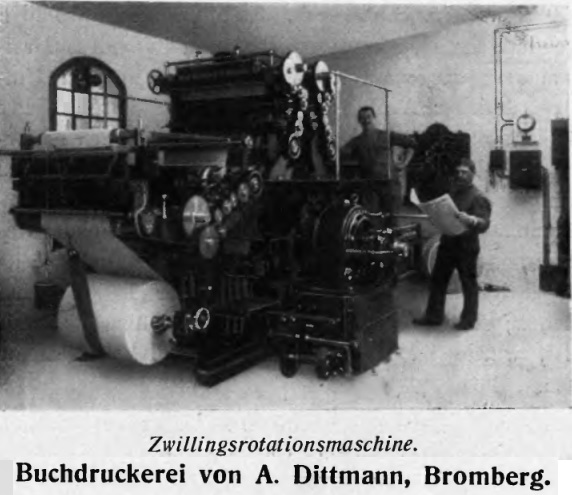
Print house Dittmann at Nr.13 ca 1906

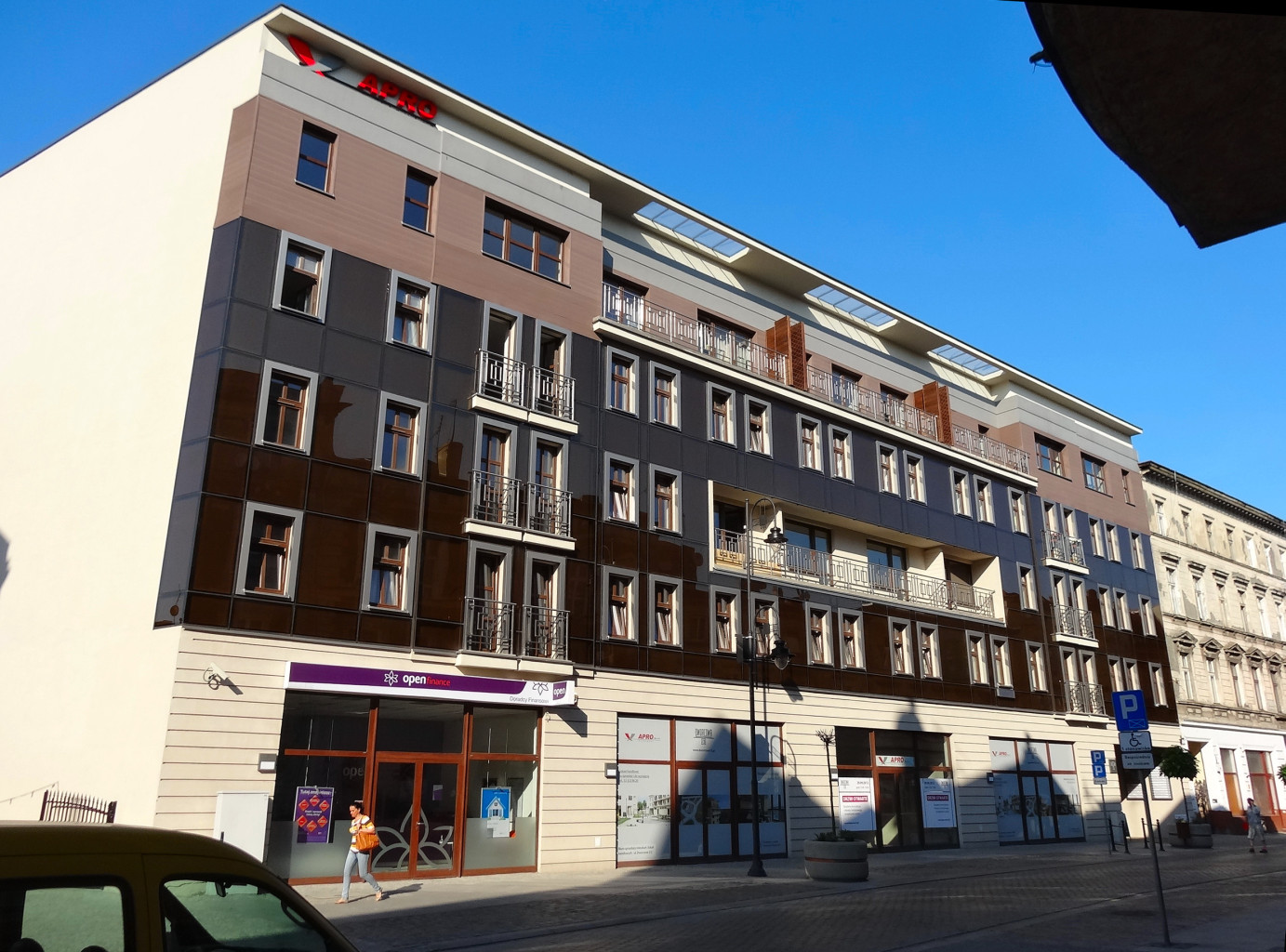
Facade on Dworcowa Street

=== Tenement at 14 ===
1899

Neo-Renaissance

The first owner of this house, then at Bahnhofstraße 93, was Ernst Schmidt, a merchant. He lived here until World War I, having opened in the building a factory of drive belts. After 1900, it housed the seat of engineering firm Weidlich & Berthold.

Neo-Renaissance features of the building (arched windows, pediments, low roof), could almost be called Neo-baroque by the choice of volute shaped motifs for the wrought iron balconies, or the roof pediment.

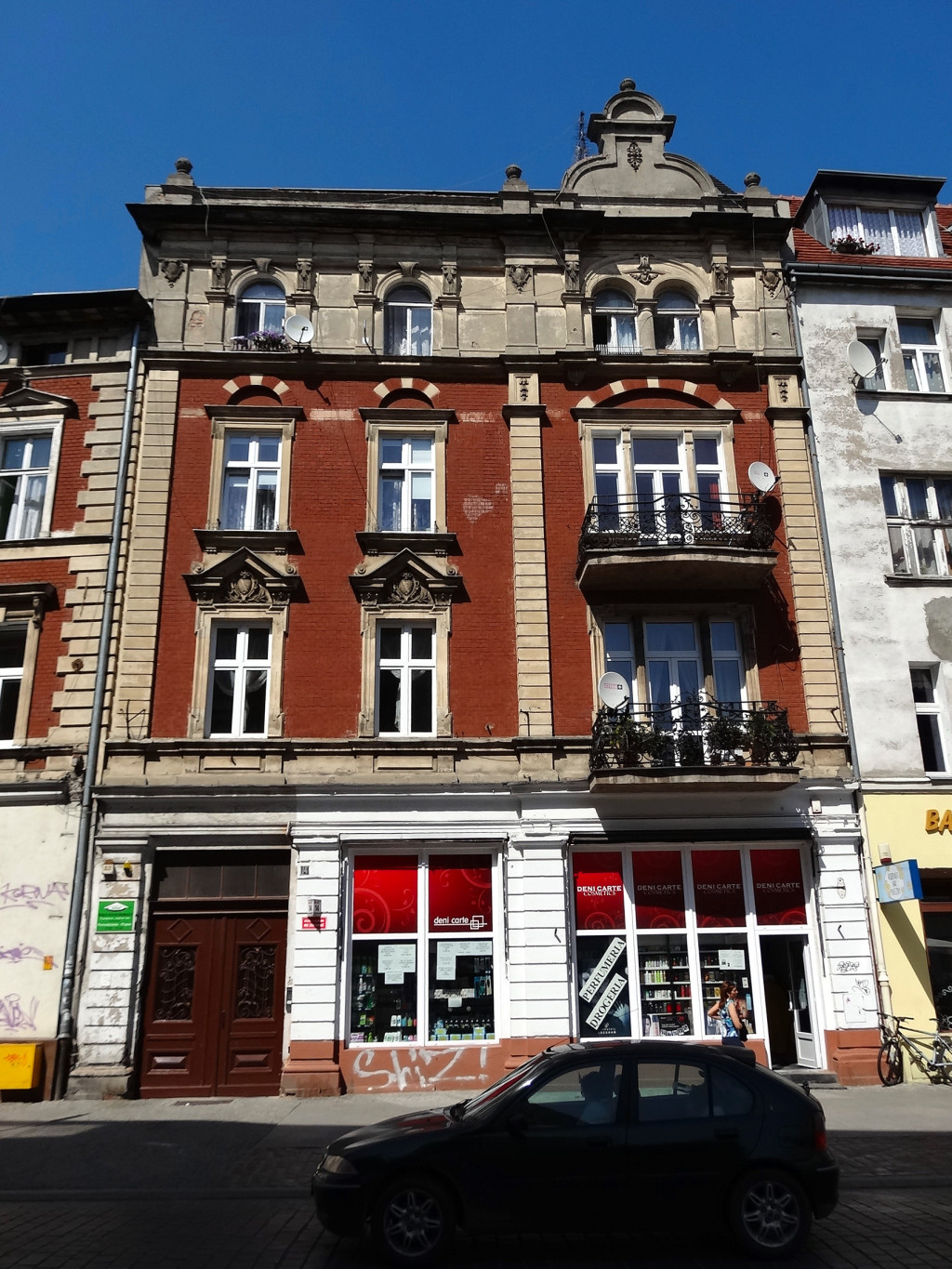
Facade onto Dworcowa Street

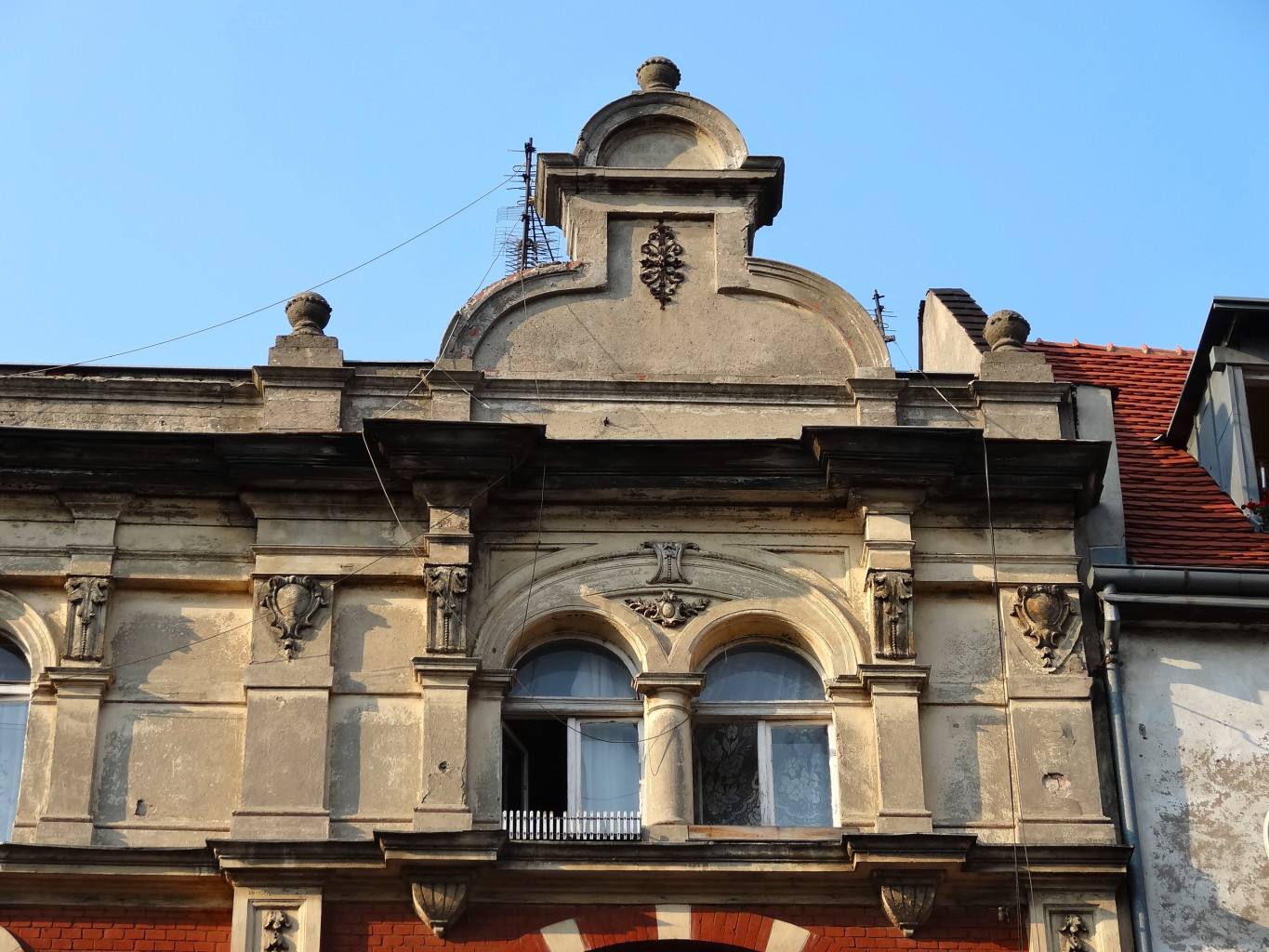
Detail of the roof pediment

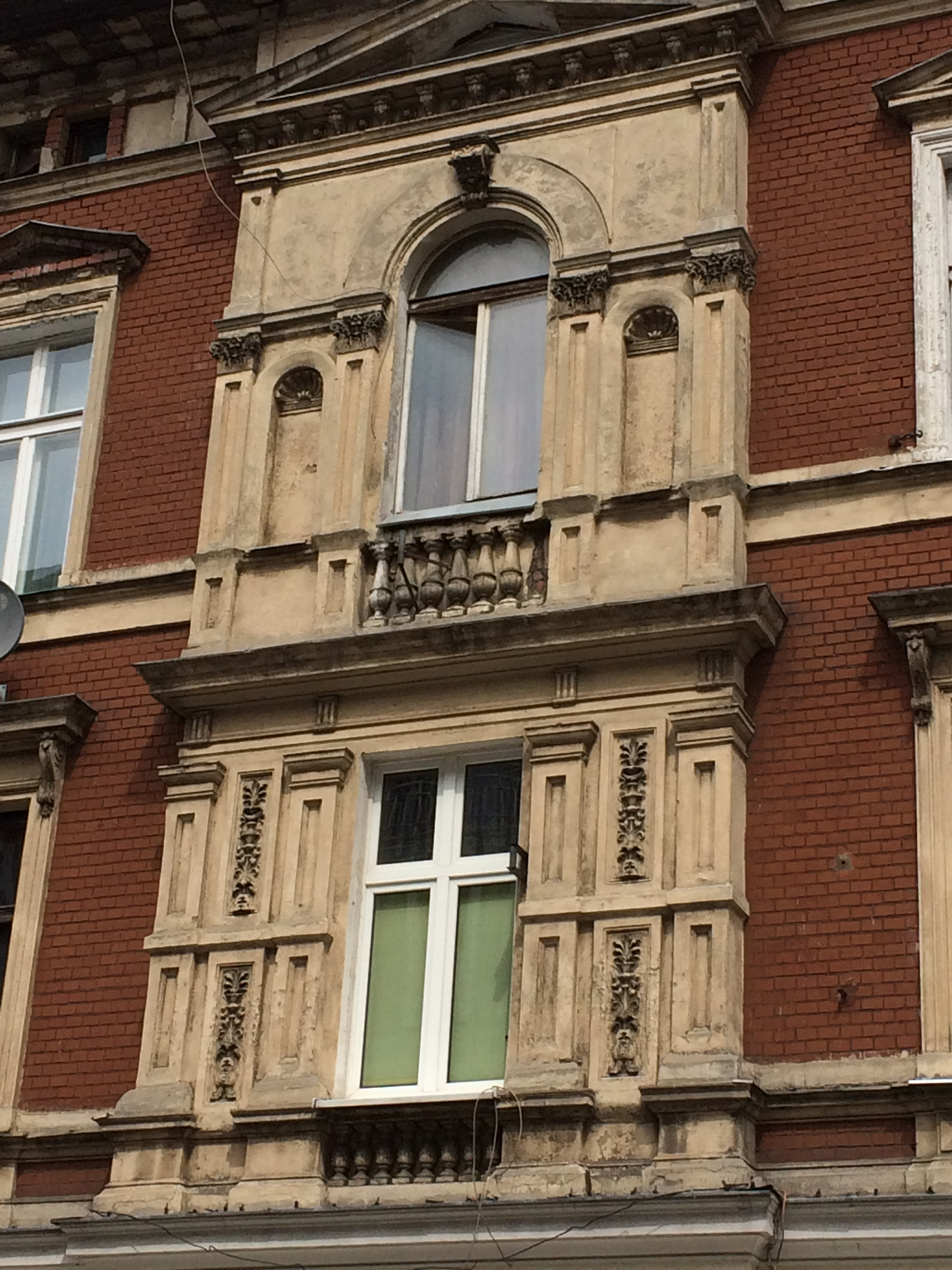
Detail of window decoration

=== Tenement at 15 ===
1877

Neoclassicism

Registered at Bahnhofstraße 6, then 6a at its inception, the building was commissioned by F.M. Schoenfelder, who rented the rooms. In 1910, the edifice housed the Bromberg music and opera school (German: Bromberger Hochschule für Musik und Opernschule), run by Carl Schöne who lived there.

The main elevation still awaits better days, however, one can notice characteristic elements of neoclassic architecture: symmetry, triangular pedimented windows, cartouches with rosettes and corbel table. In particular, one can appreciate the preserved entrance, with a wrought iron grillwork adorned with sunflowers and leaves, as well as the large wood double door topped with a transom light. The building has been entirely renovated at the beginning of 2019.

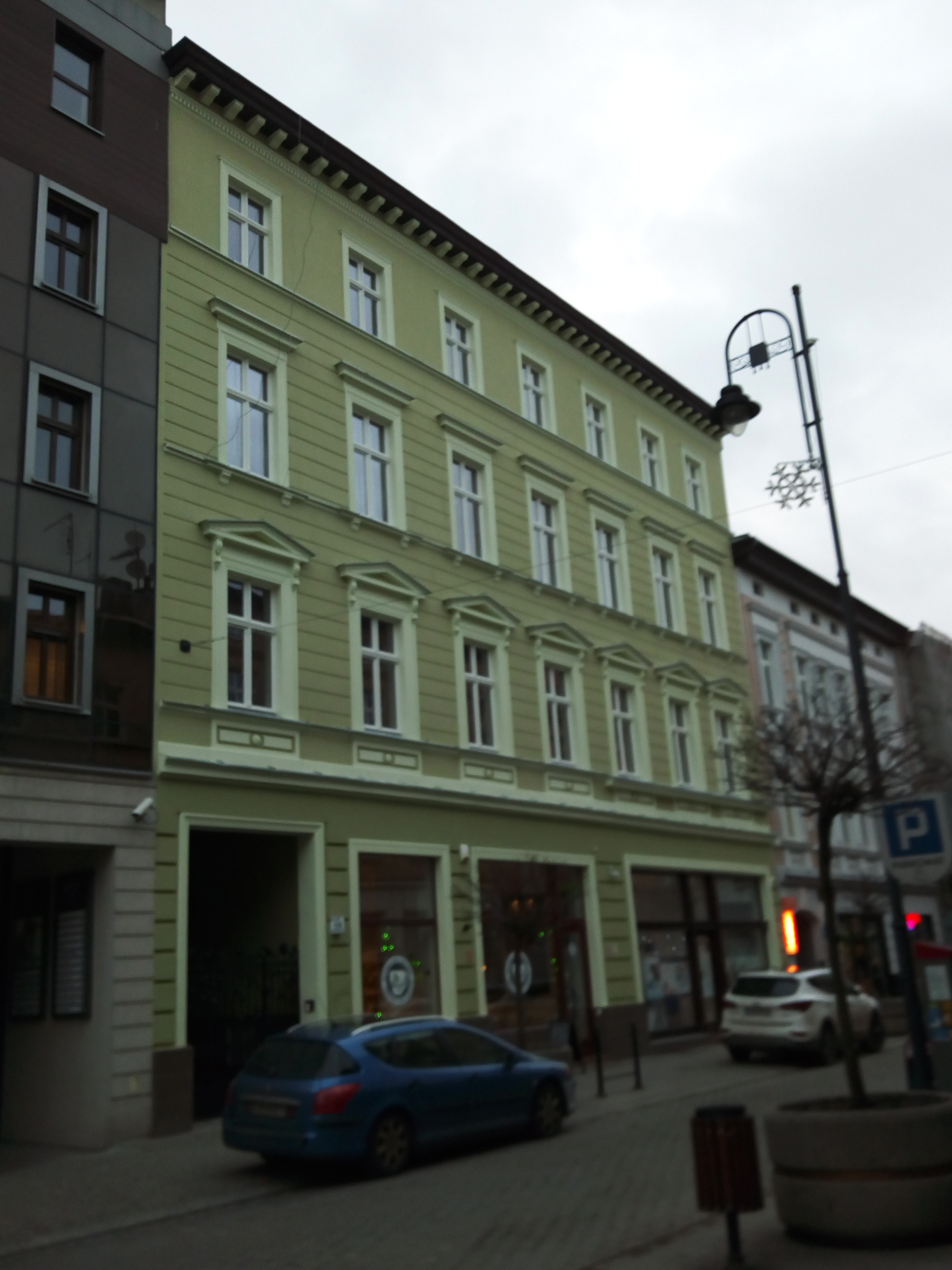
Refurbished elevation, view from the street

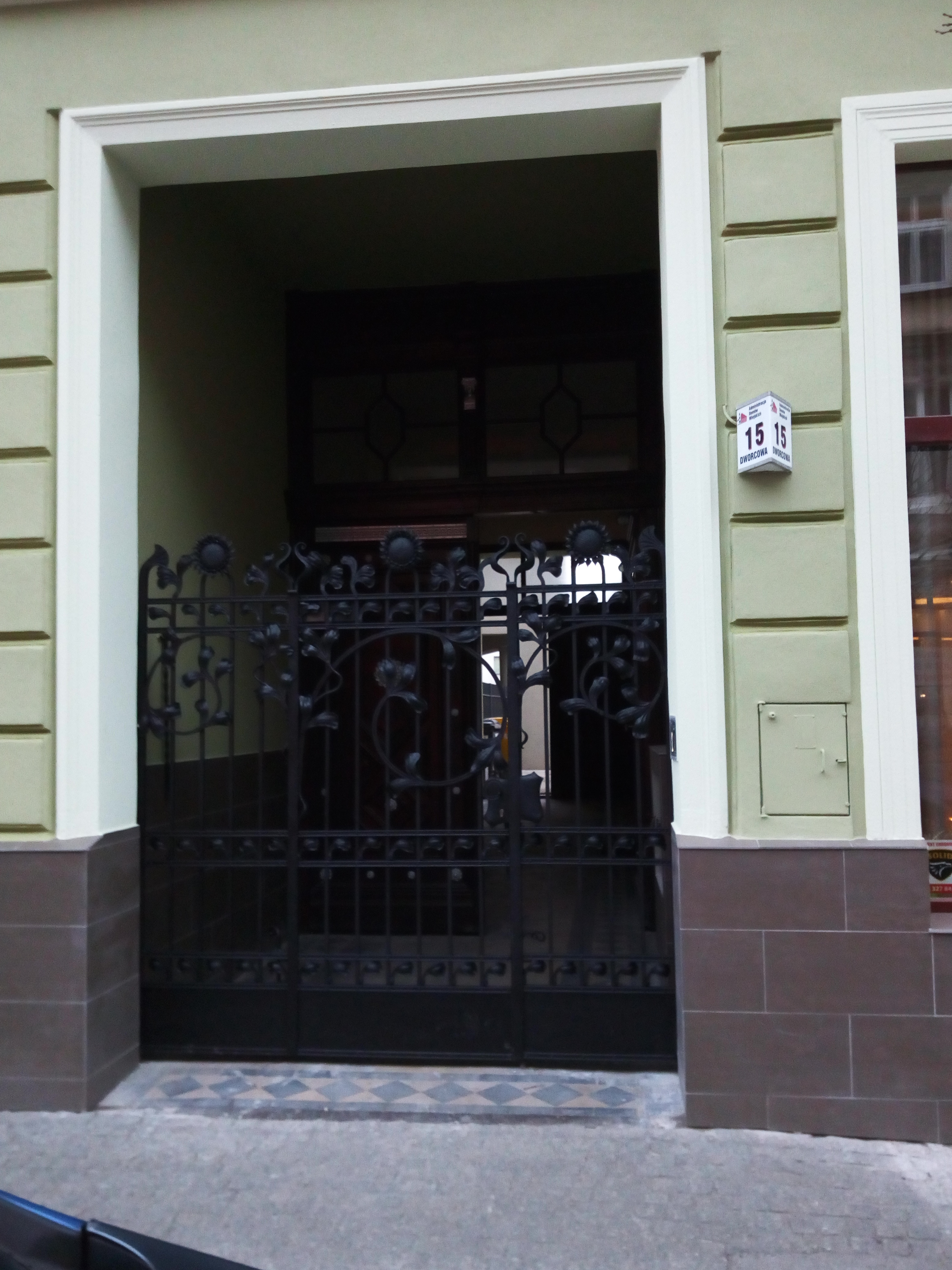
Entrance portal with grill

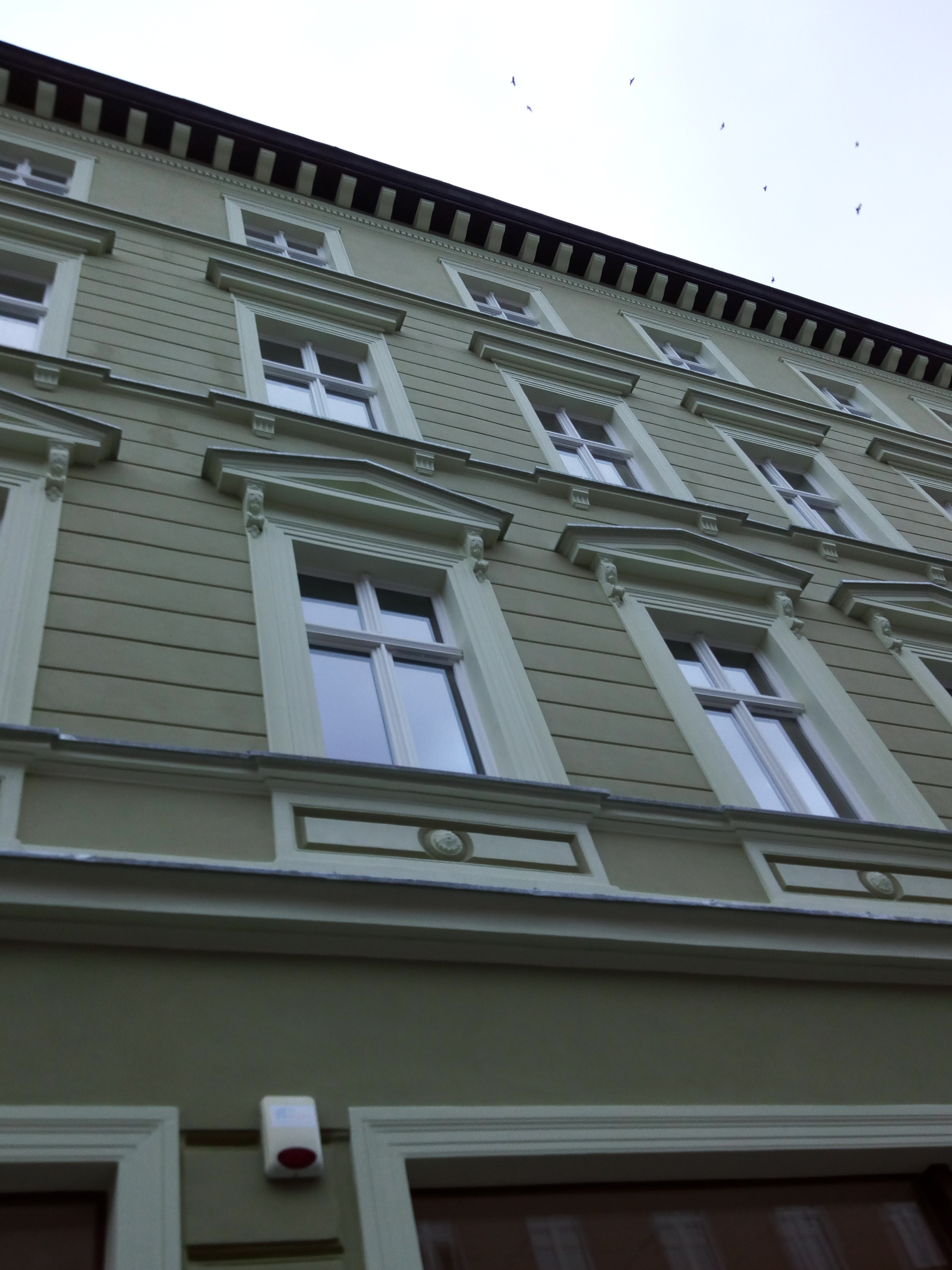
Facade details

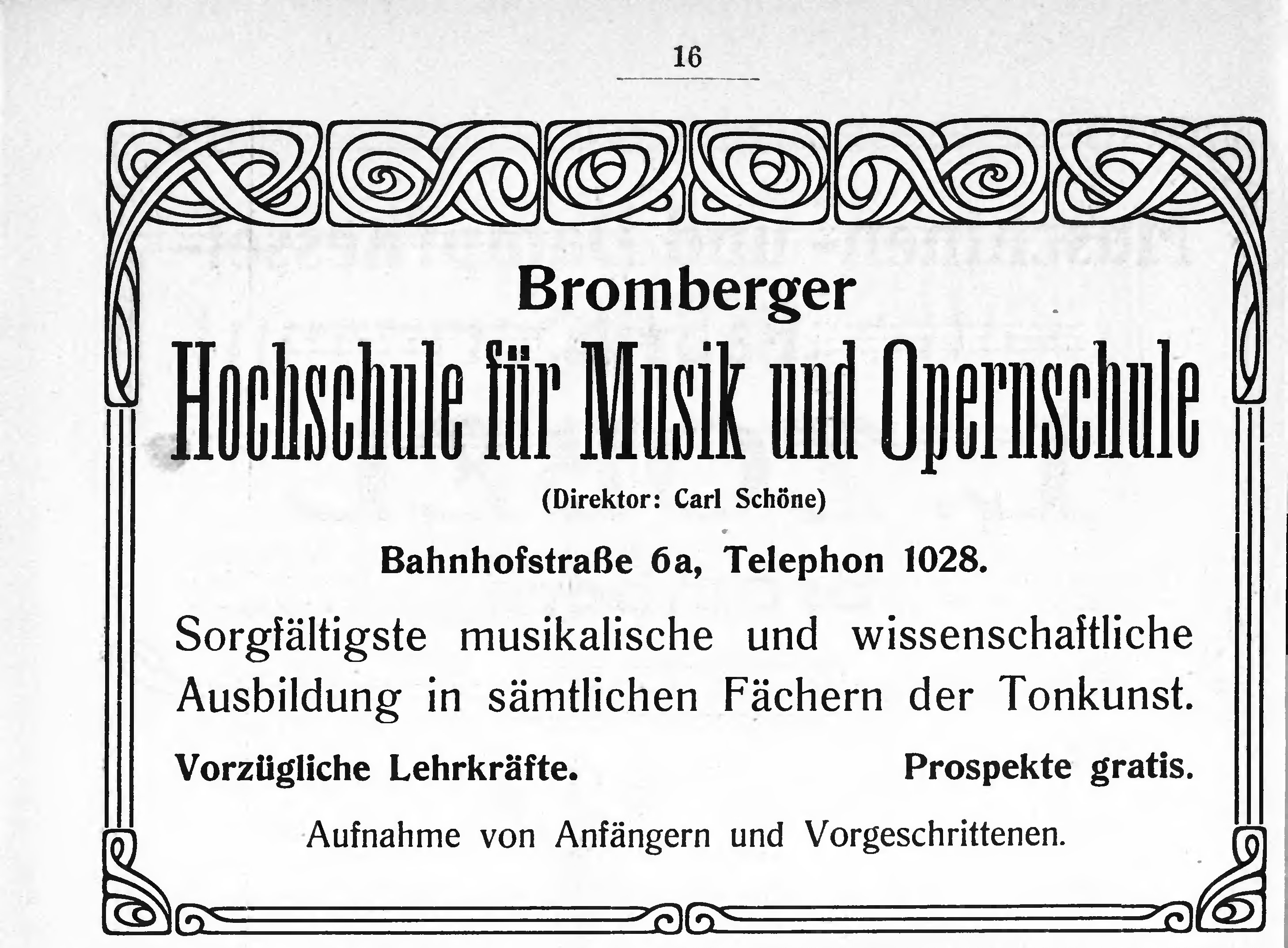
Advertising for Carl Schöne's music school in 1910

=== Tenement at 16 ===
1875

Neo-Renaissance

Ferdinand Th. Zorn, a wood manufacturer and merchant, at Bahnhofstraße 92 was the first owner of the tenement. He kept it until World War I.

The style and shape of the facade is clearly echoing the one at Nr.14. However, it displays clearly Neo-Renaissance characteristics. Motifs are neat, each floor has a specific window adornament, the slight bay window stresses the symmetry of the elevation. One can notice the minute ornamentation of this bay-window (niches, balustrade, volutes) as well as the corbel table at the top.

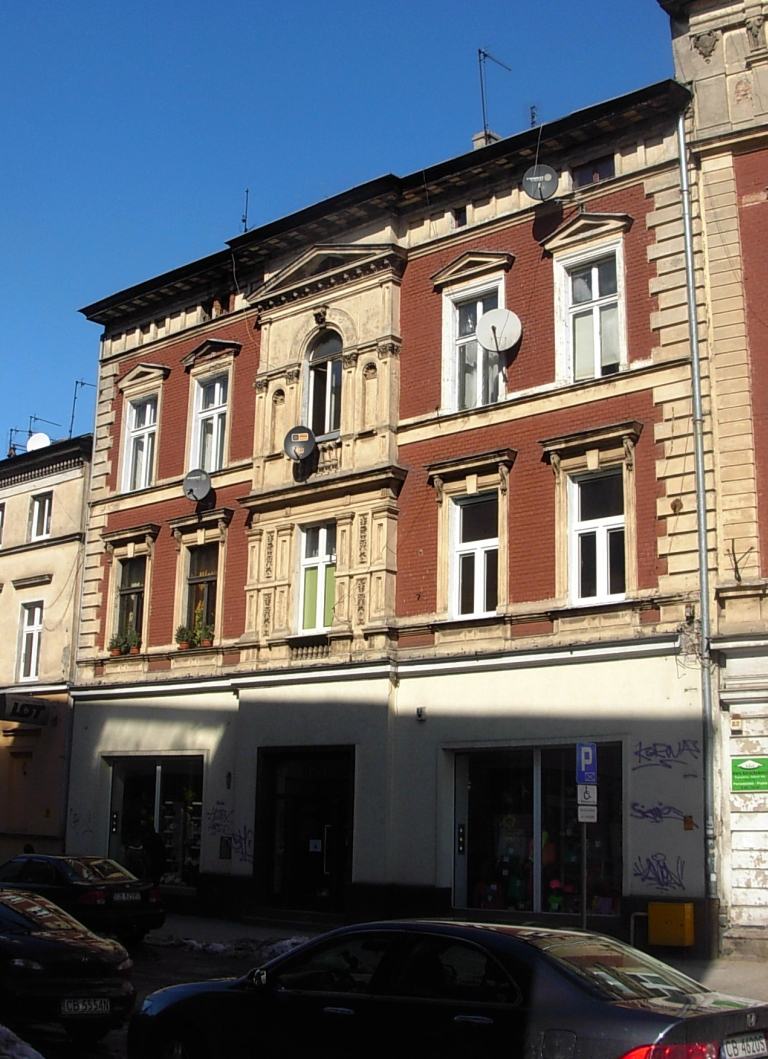
Facade on Dworcowa Street

=== Tenement at 17 ===
1896

Eclecticism, Neo-Renaissance

First owner of the building at Bahnhofstraße 6 was Wilhelm Schönfelder. In 1888, Hermann Löhnert moved here as landlord: he was the founder and director of a joint-stock company of a factory producing machines for foundries, established in 1868 in Bydgoszcz. The firm still exists today, under the name MAKRUM, located at 11/19 Leśna street.

Although lacking maintenance, the facade still boasts architectural details. Pediments on first floor windows, but also bossages are present. The most interesting decoration is the adornment surrounding middle openings on both floors: pilasters and garland ornaments are topped on the upper floor by crown ornaments.

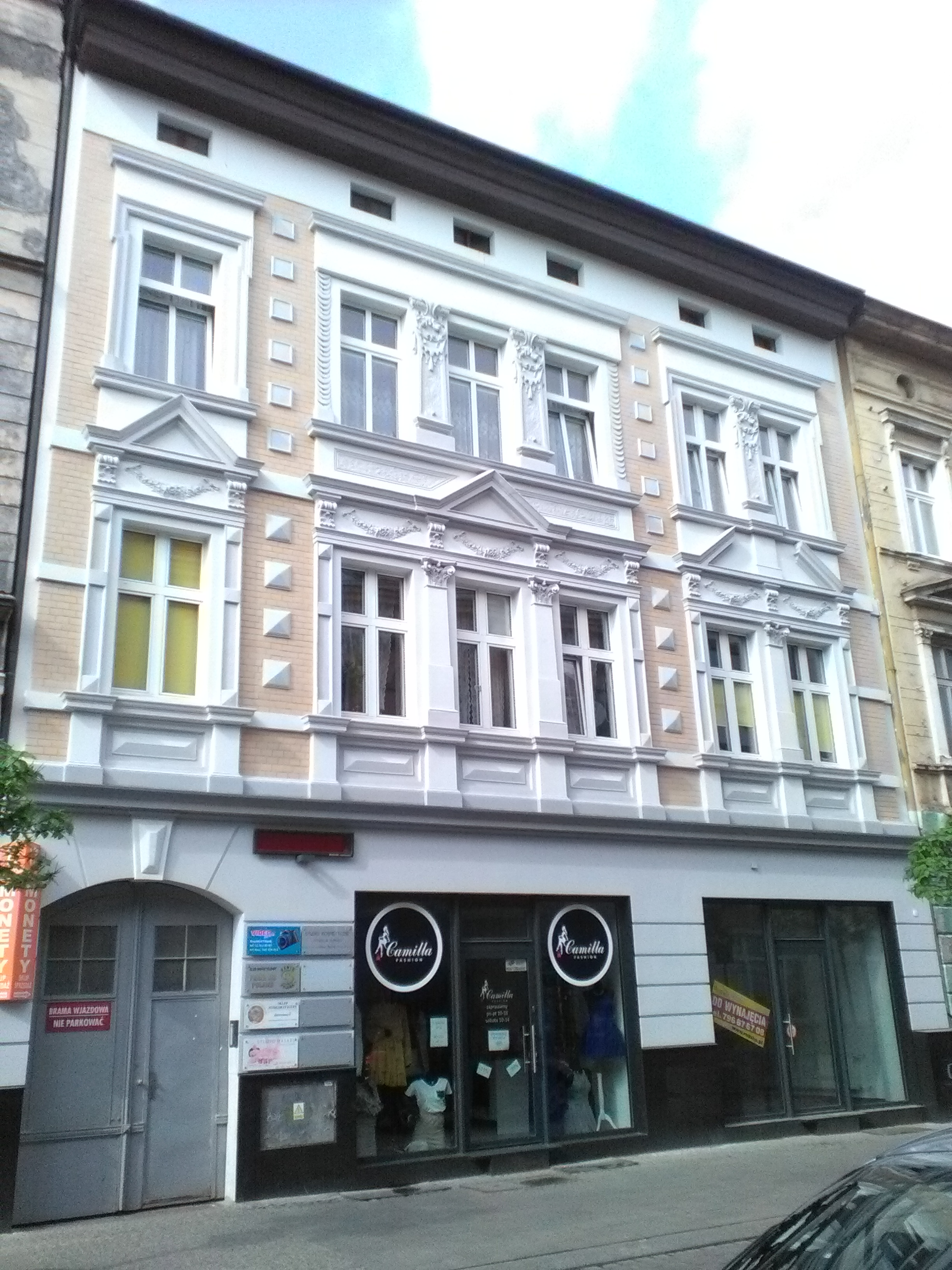
main elevation

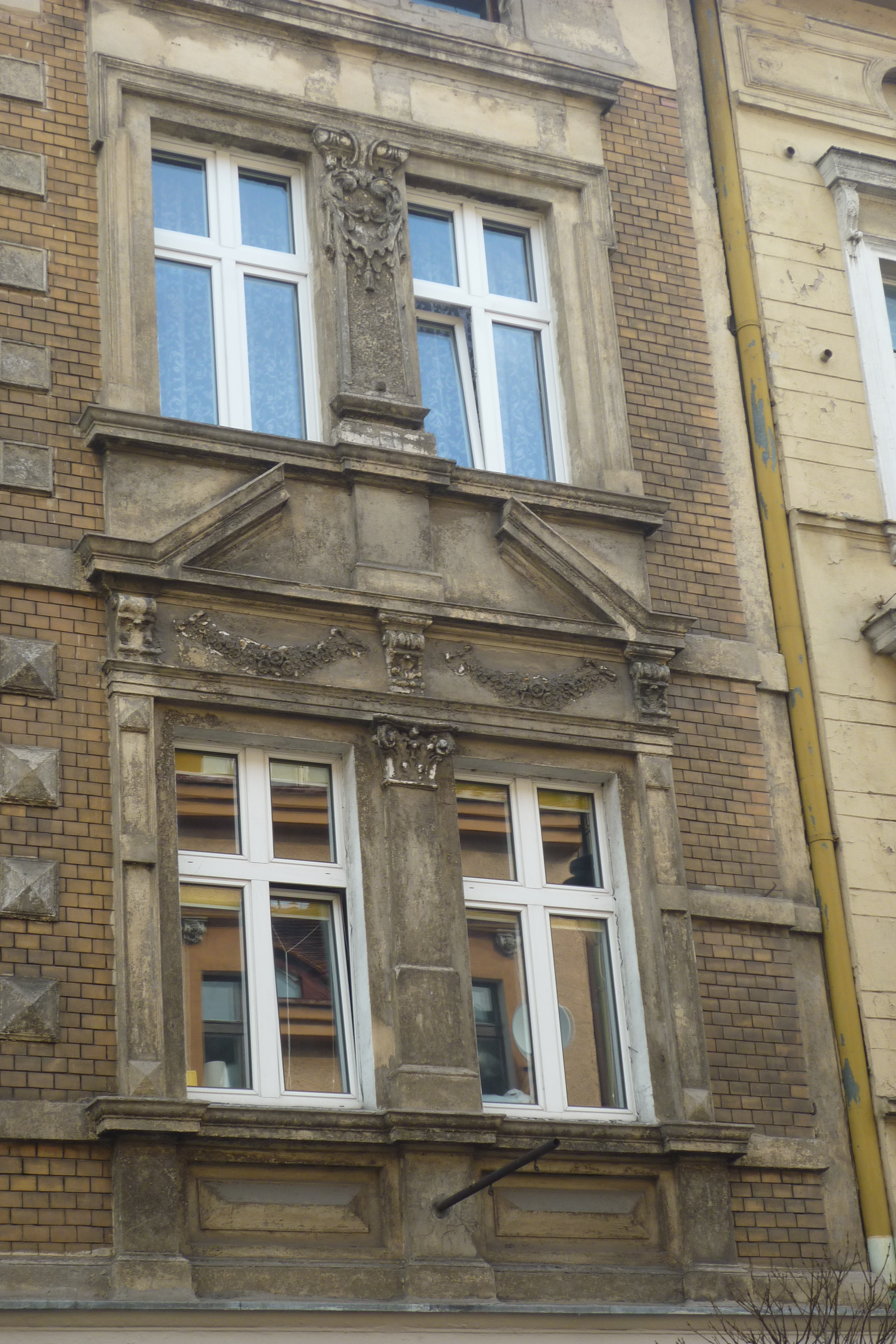
Windows decoration detail before renovation

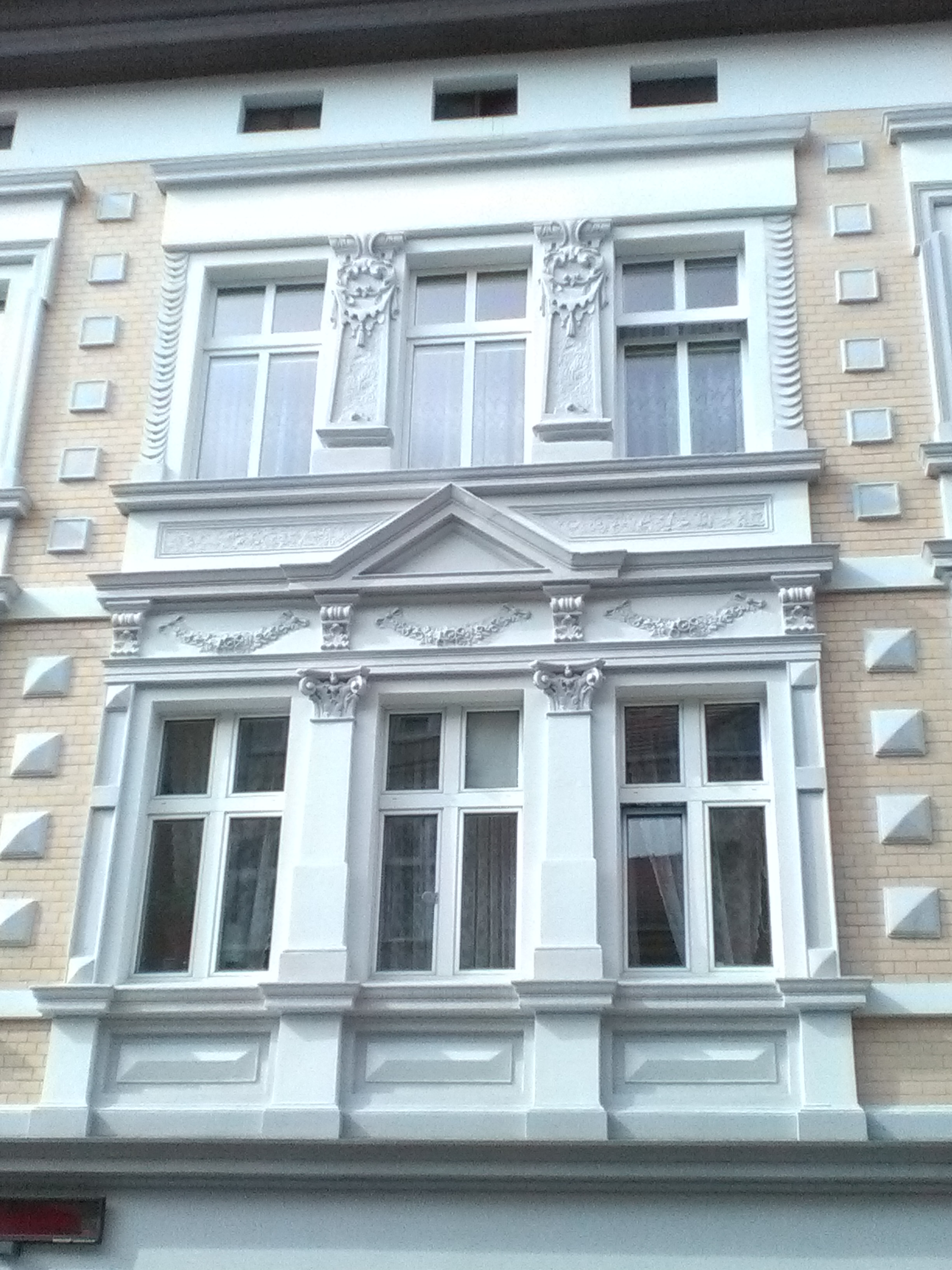
Detail of the facade after refurbishing

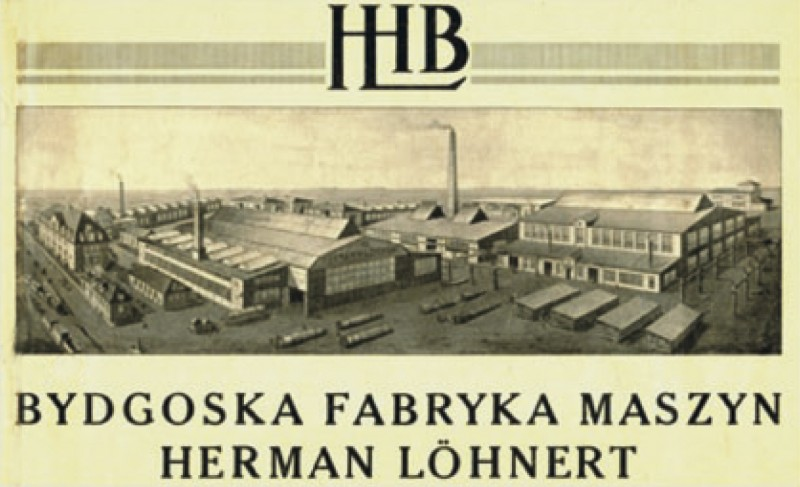
Picture of Herman Löhnert Factory in the 1930s

=== Tenement at 19 corner with Warmińskiego street ===
Registered on Kuyavian-Pomeranian Voivodeship heritage list, Nr.601287-Reg.A/968, November 12, 1992

1880, by Albert Rose

Eclecticism

Friedrish Giese, a brewer at Bahnhofstraße 7a was the first owner of the house. Otto Pfefferkorn, a successful entrepreneur in the furniture business, acquired it in 1887, before having his own house built at Nr.12. In 1910, the building became an hotel, Reichshof, run by Carl Müller. In 1922, it changed to Goplana, run by Jan Gawron, then "Boston". From 1932 to 1939, it has been renamed "Gastronomia" with led by H. Katorski. It is now a habitation building, where the Honorary Consul of the Federal Republic of Germany in Bydgoszcz moved in 2019 -previously it was located at 49 Śniadeckich street.

The building renovated in 2019 a nice decoration on the first floor, with pediments topping windows and ornamented cartouche beneath, as well as a row of round openings below the roof. The main feature is the grand two-floor stretched bay window standing on streets corner.

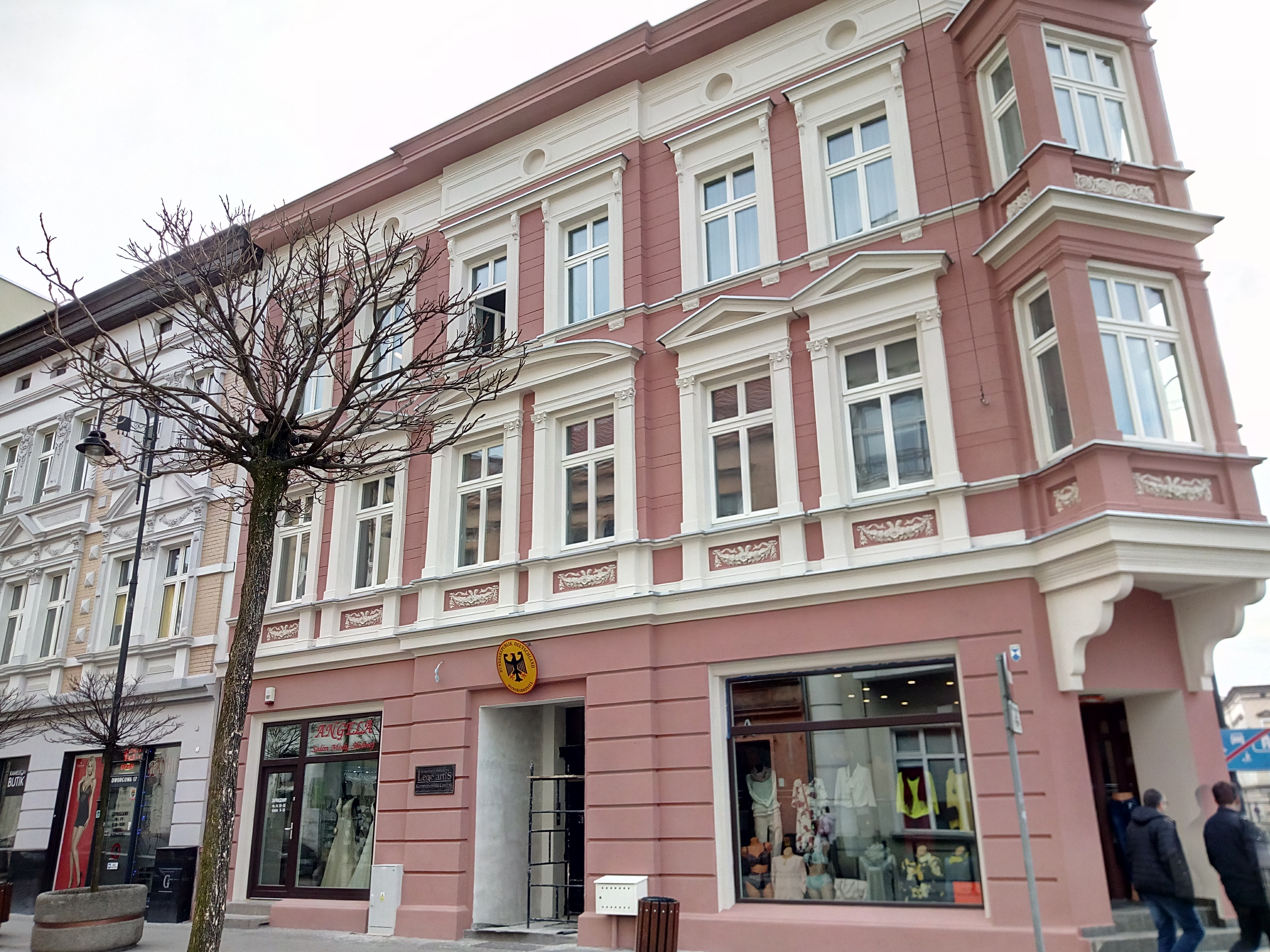
Elevation on Dworcowa street

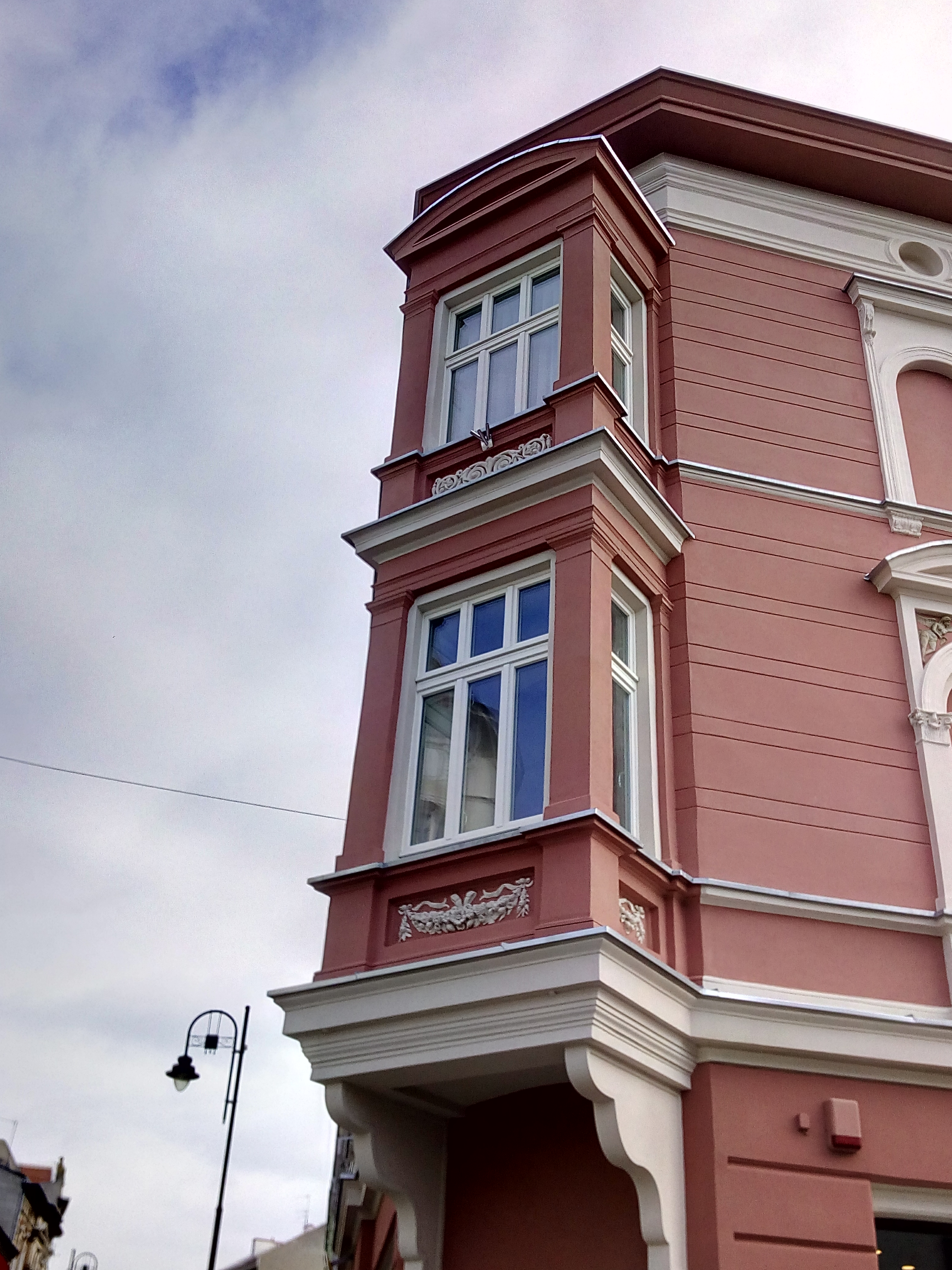
Bay window

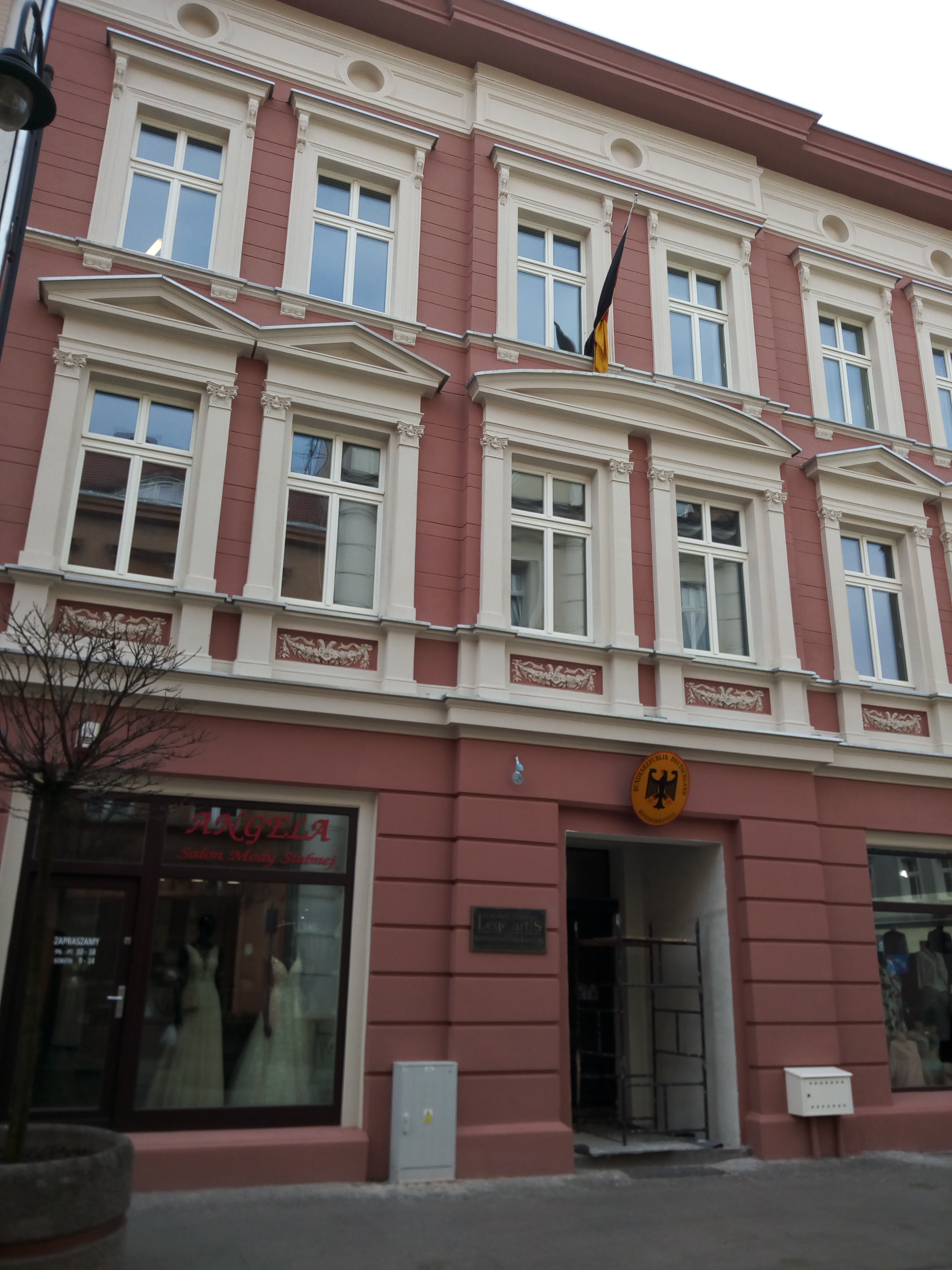
Honorary German Consulate

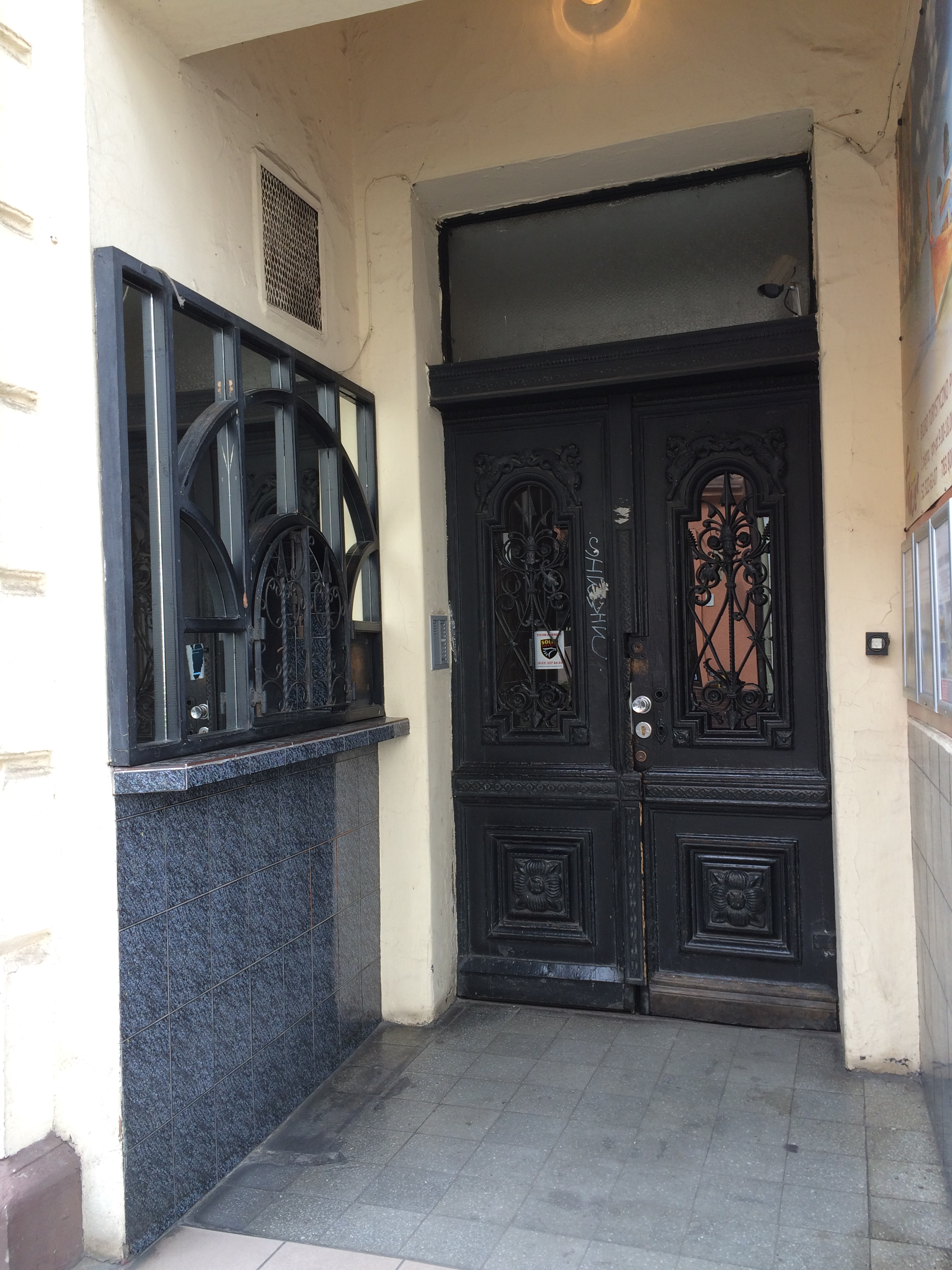
Gate and door recess

=== Tenement at 22 ===
circa 1875

Eclecticism

The Gottschalck family has owned Bahnhofstraße 89 building since 1876. In the 1900s (decade), Hermann Albrecht, a merchant became the owner: at that time he also possessed the tenement at Nr.20 and at 18 Warmińskiego Street. Since 1990 is located here one of the first pizzeria in Bydgoszcz (Pizzeria Ambar).

The main elevation shows nice architectural details: a large wrought iron balcony overlooking a delicate wrought iron entry gate, pediments on first floor windows, corbels on the second floor and arch topped windows in the middle of the facade.

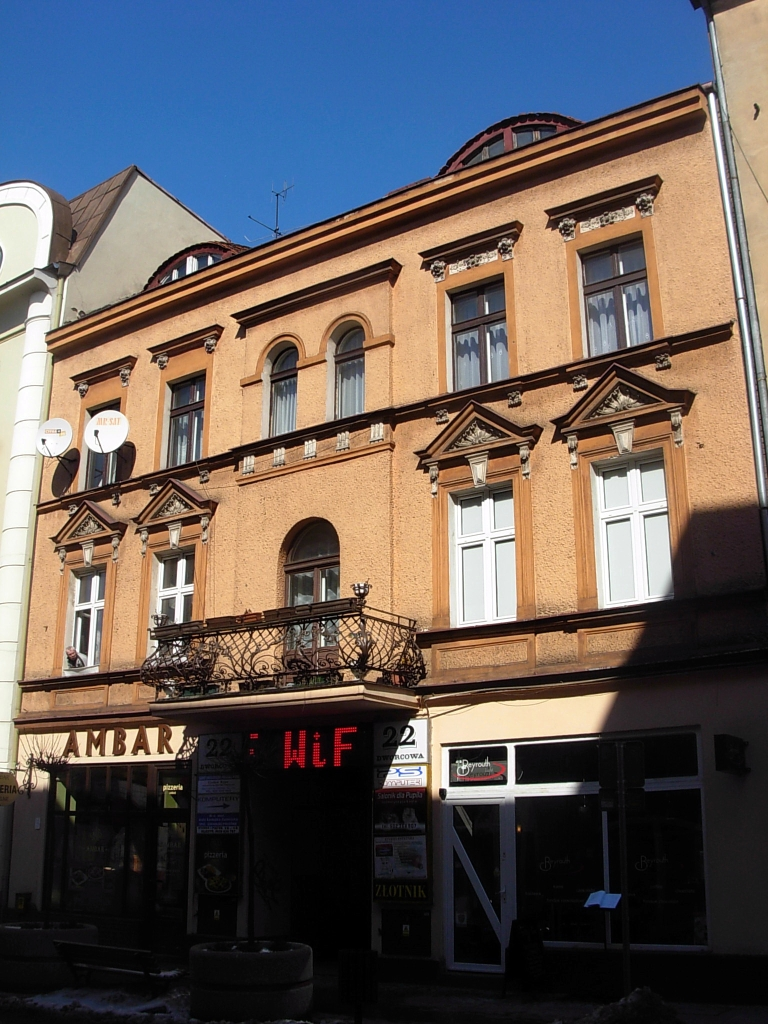
Facade on Dworcowa Street

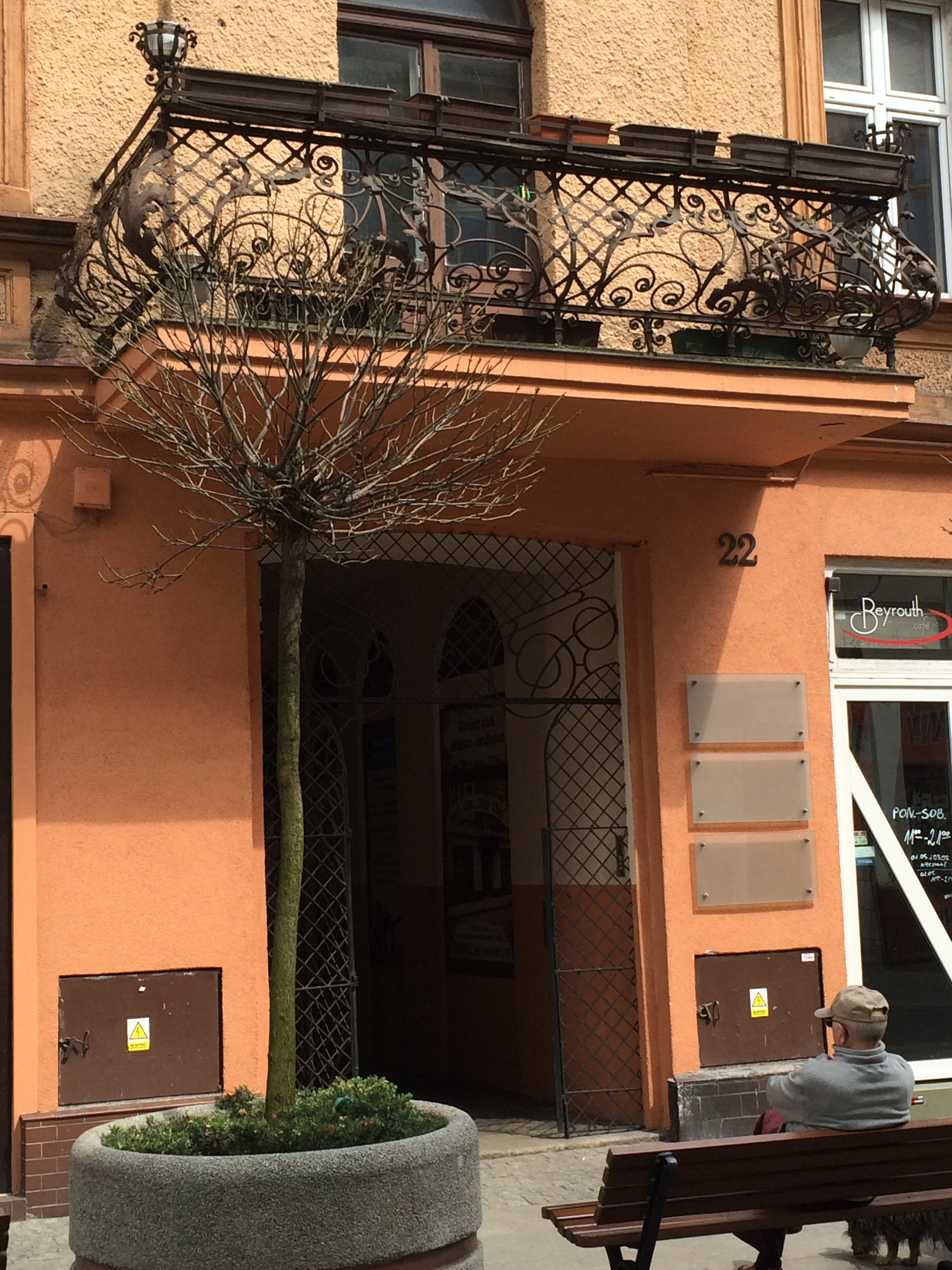
Detail of the gate and balcony

=== Tenement at 23 ===
1876

Neoclassical architecture

The first registered owner of Bahnhofstraße 9 is Emil Albrecht, running a blacksmith workshop producing wagons.

The facade on the street displays a lean and balanced elevation, renovated in the late 2010s.

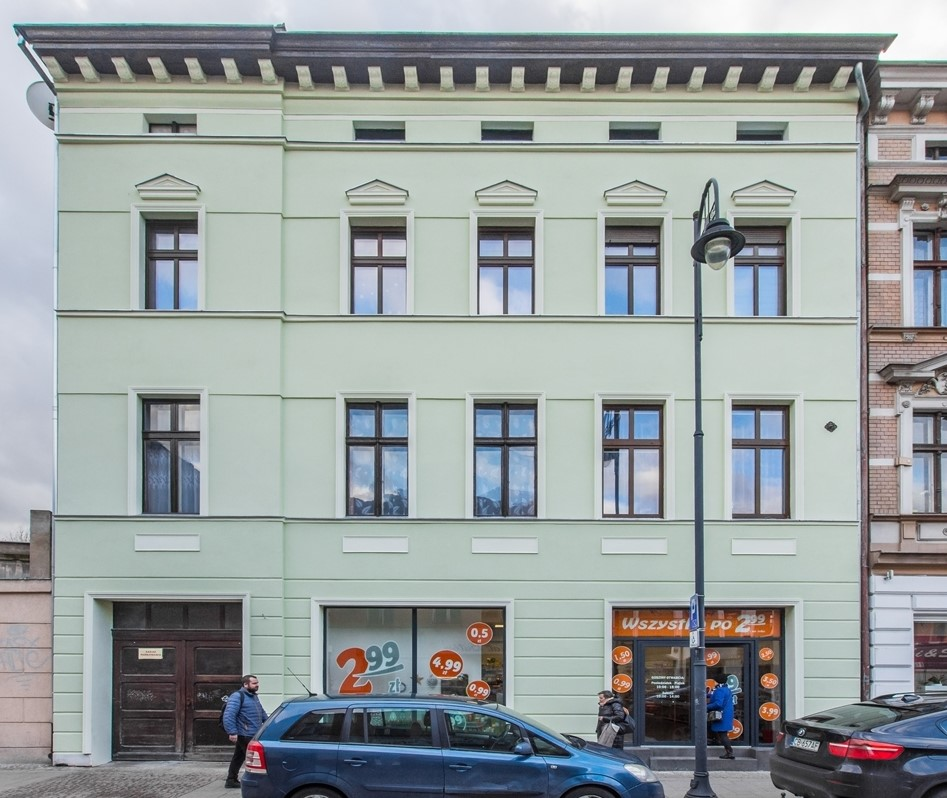
Facade at 23 Dworcowa Street

=== Tenement at 18 Warmińskiego street corner with Dworcowa Street ===
1905, by Carl Rose

Art Nouveau

First mention of the building at then Bahnhofstraße 88 occurred in 1872: Hermann Burow, a backer, was the owner. In 1890, August Hoffmann set up there a butcher shop (German: Fleischerei und Wurst-Fabrik). During the interwar period, it has been the local seat of the National Bank of Poland. It is now the seat of Bydgoszcz Tax Office .

The building recently renovated is a nice showcase of Art Nouveau architecture in Bydgoszcz: round shapes (dormers, gate, windows), vegetal motifs on the elevation, the bay windows and asymmetry of both facades.

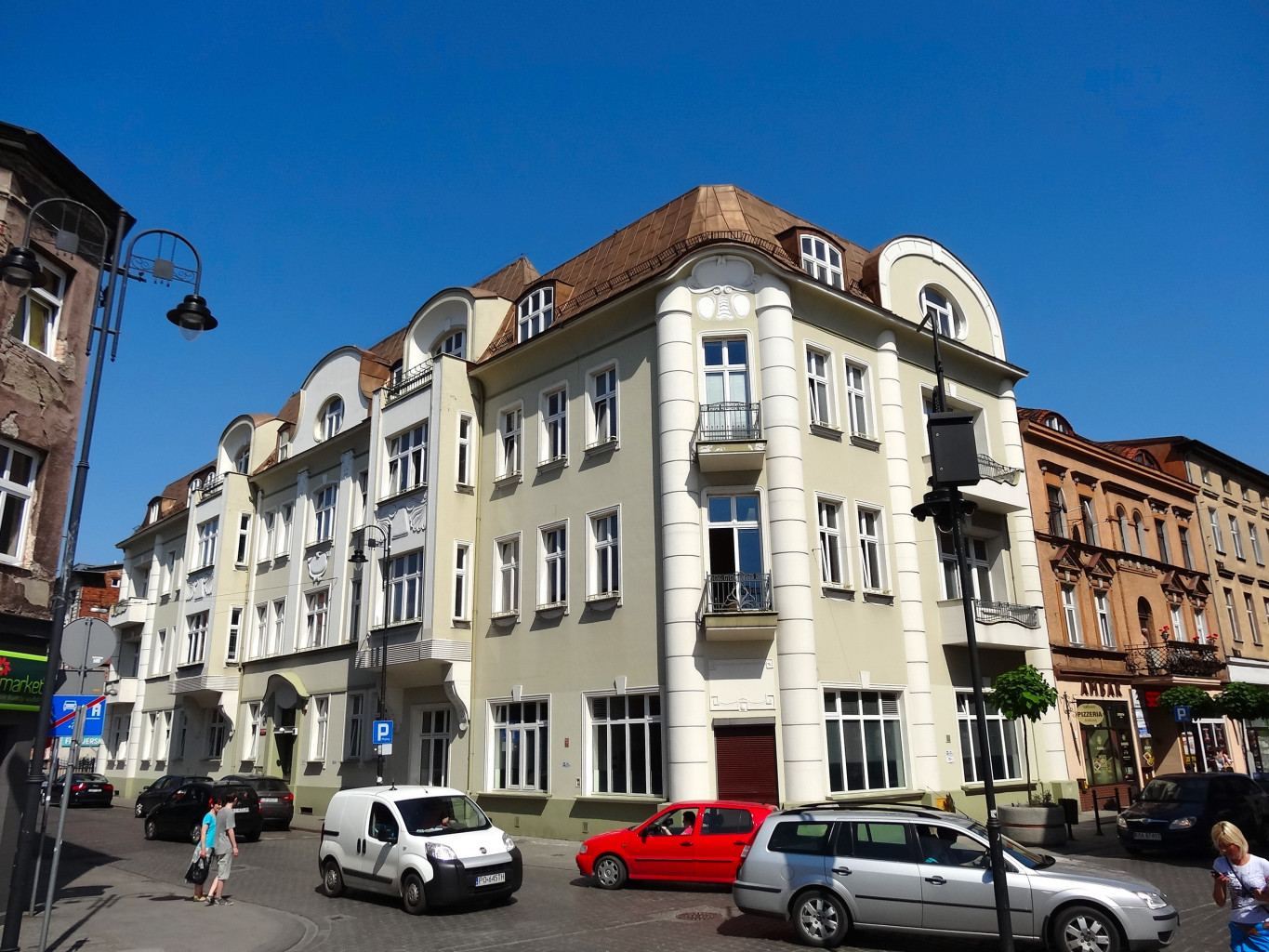
Facades view from street crossing

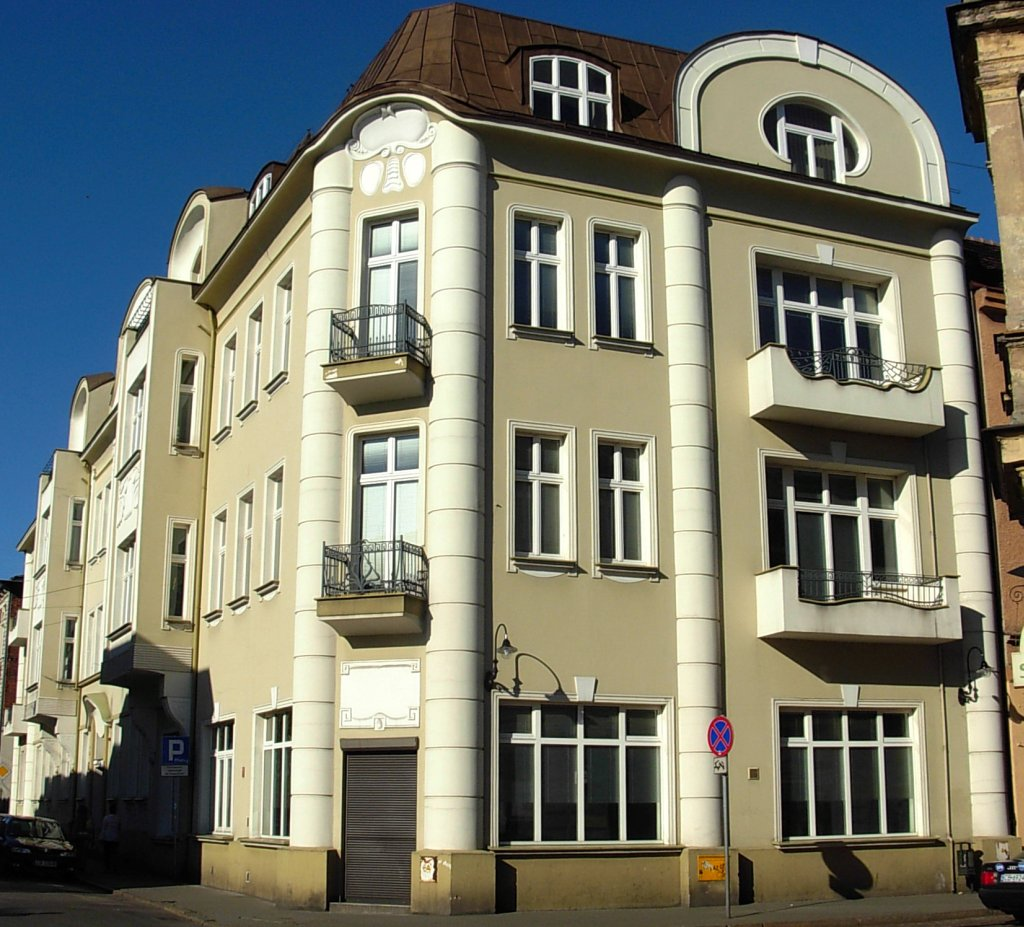
Facade on Dworcowa Street

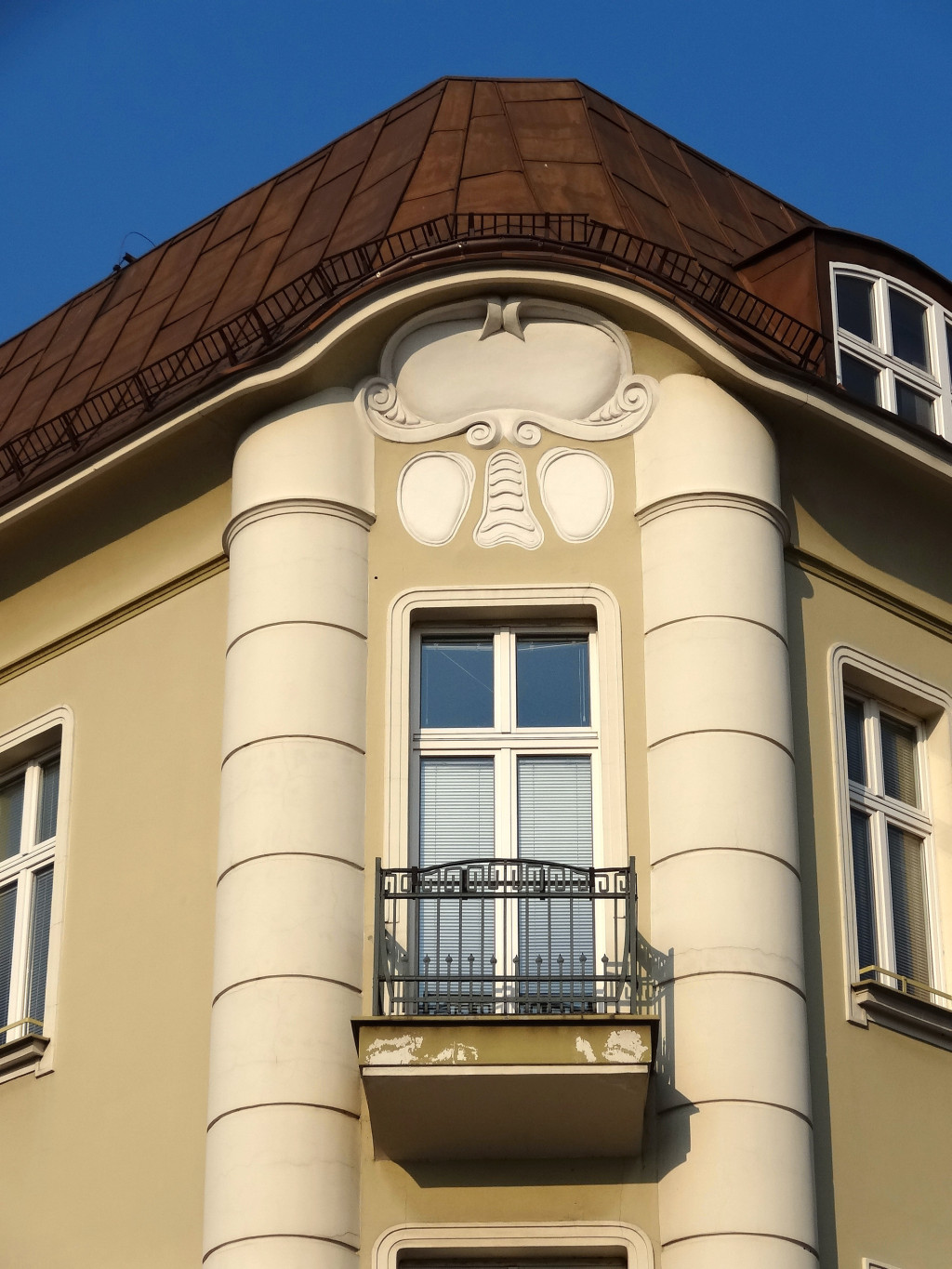
Detail of corner facade

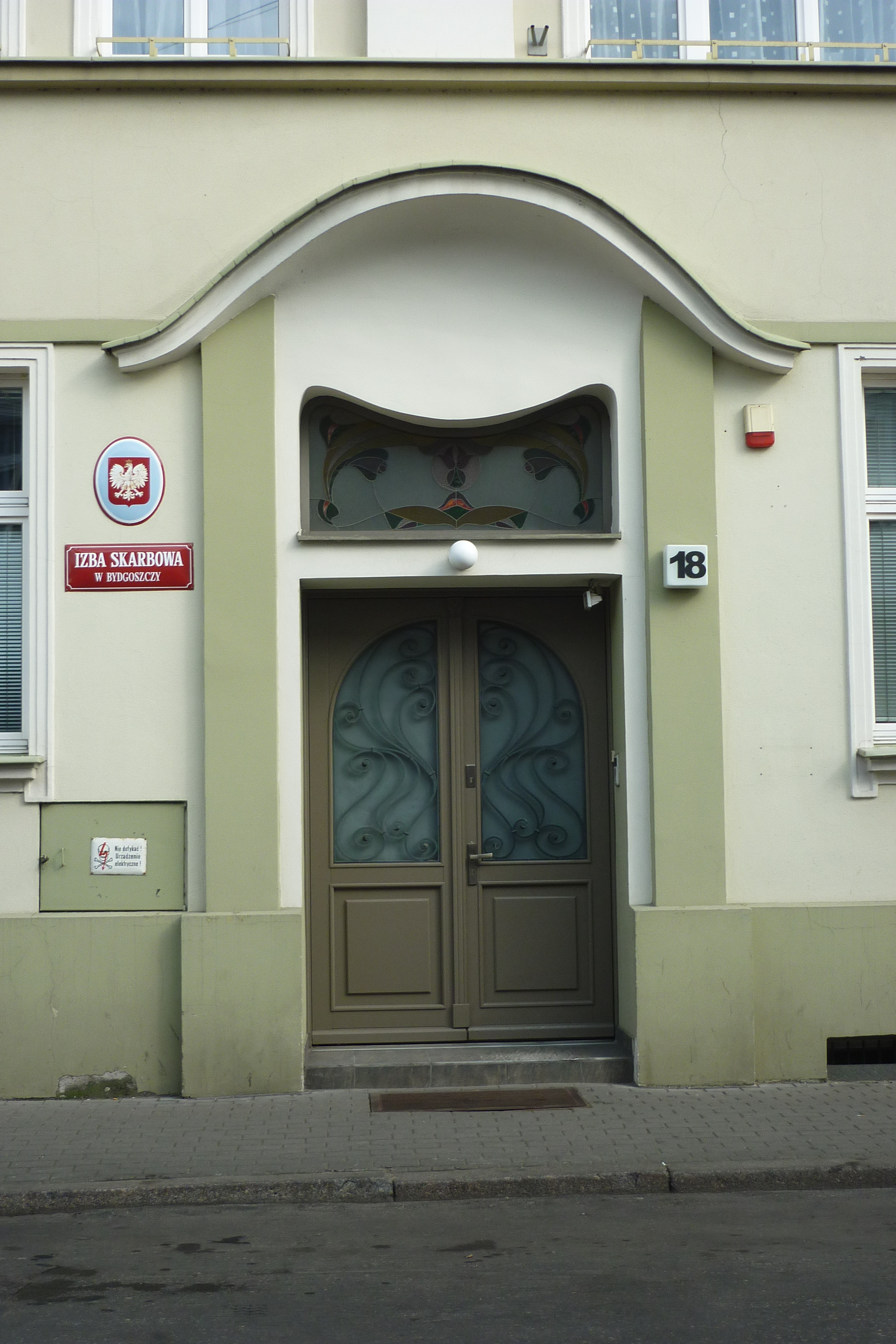
Detail of the gate

=== Tenement at 27 ===
circa 1875

Eclecticism

Carl Wilhelm Feyertag, a merchant, was the first owner of this house then at Bahnhofstraße 11. His widow lived there until the 1910s. Feyertag widow owned also a tenement at 19 Piastkowski Square.

Facade style is inspired by Neoclassical architecture, similar to the neighbouring at Nr.29. Pilasters underline the symmetry of the elevation, with the balcony in the center.

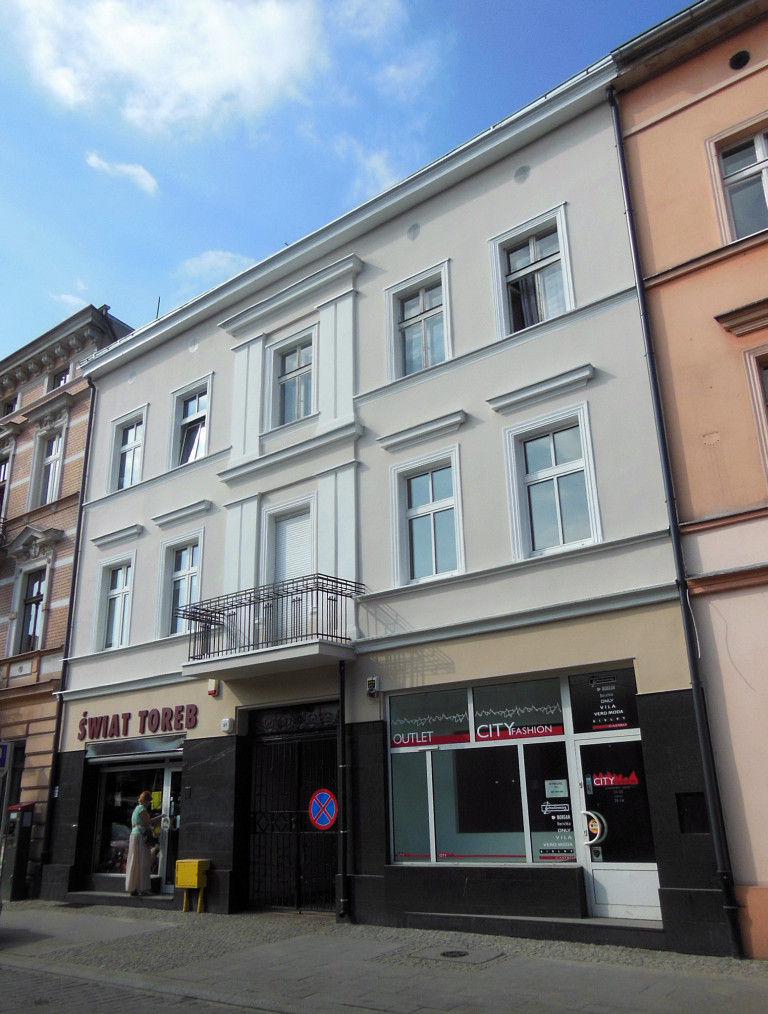
Facade on Dworcowa Street

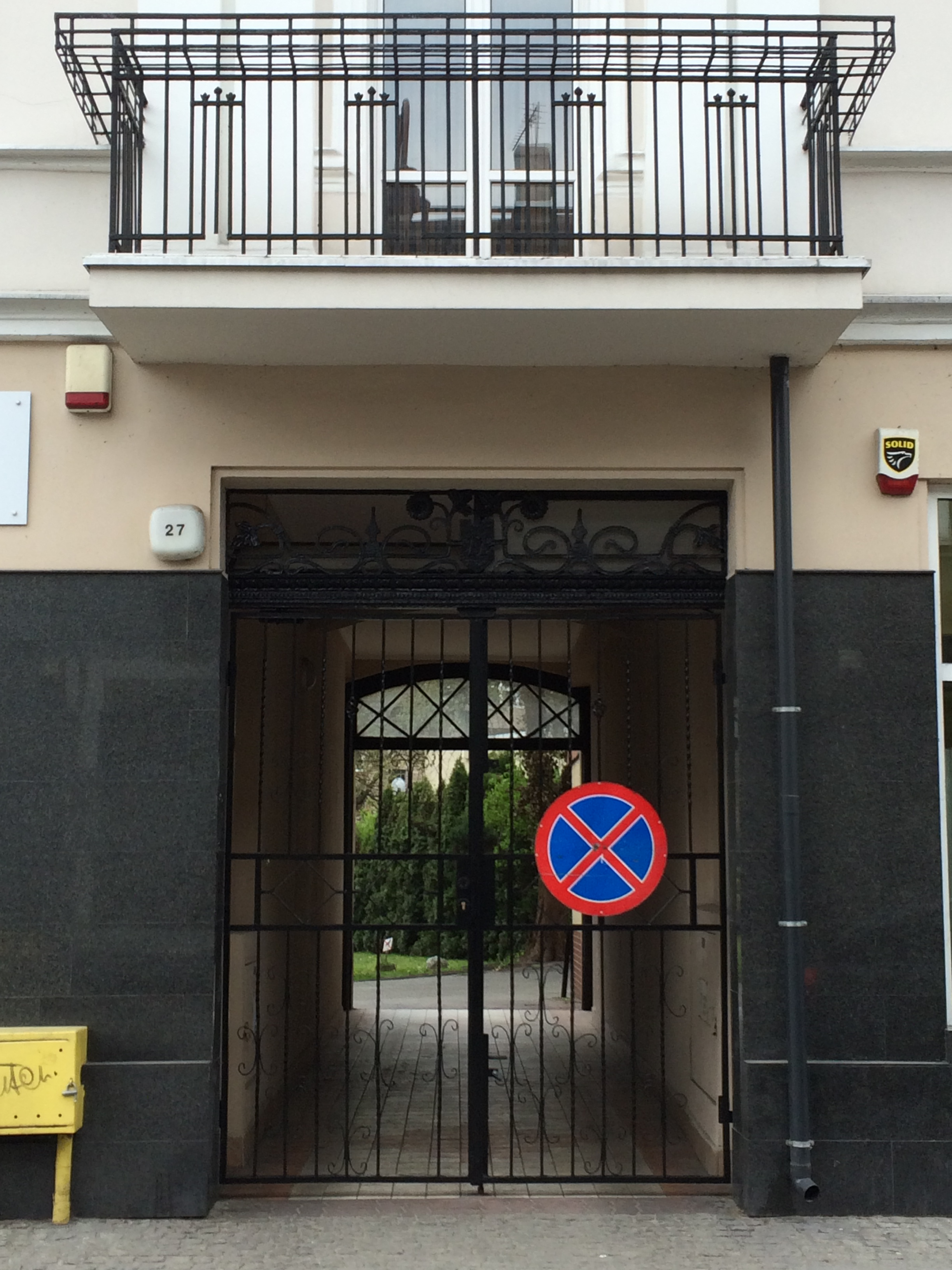
Wrought iron Gate

=== Tenement at 29 ===
ca 1850-1875

Neoclassicism

Like at Nr.27, Carl Feyetag was the first registered owner of this building in the 1870s, then at Bahnhofstraße 12. However, he never lived there. In the late 1850s, the architect Anton Hoffmann rented there with his family.

The facade displays typical Neoclassical style: symmetry, bossage wall on the bottom and a corbel table on the top. It has been renovated in 2017.

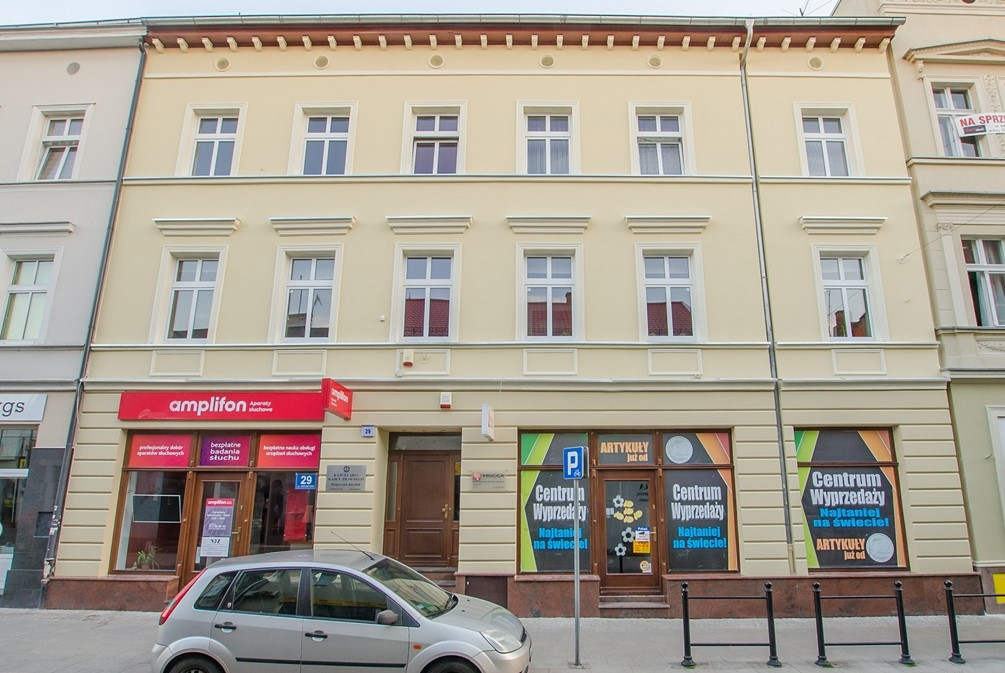
Main frontage

=== Tenement at 31 ===
1881, by H. Jenisch & Scheithauer

French and North European Eclecticism

At its inception, the tenement belonged to Franz Marr, a beer dealer, then in 1910 it was the property of Hermann Briebe, a furniture dealer.

The house differs from its neighbours by its height (one additional floor), and by its architecture with more ornaments (pilasters, corbels) and its motifs (garlands, frieze).

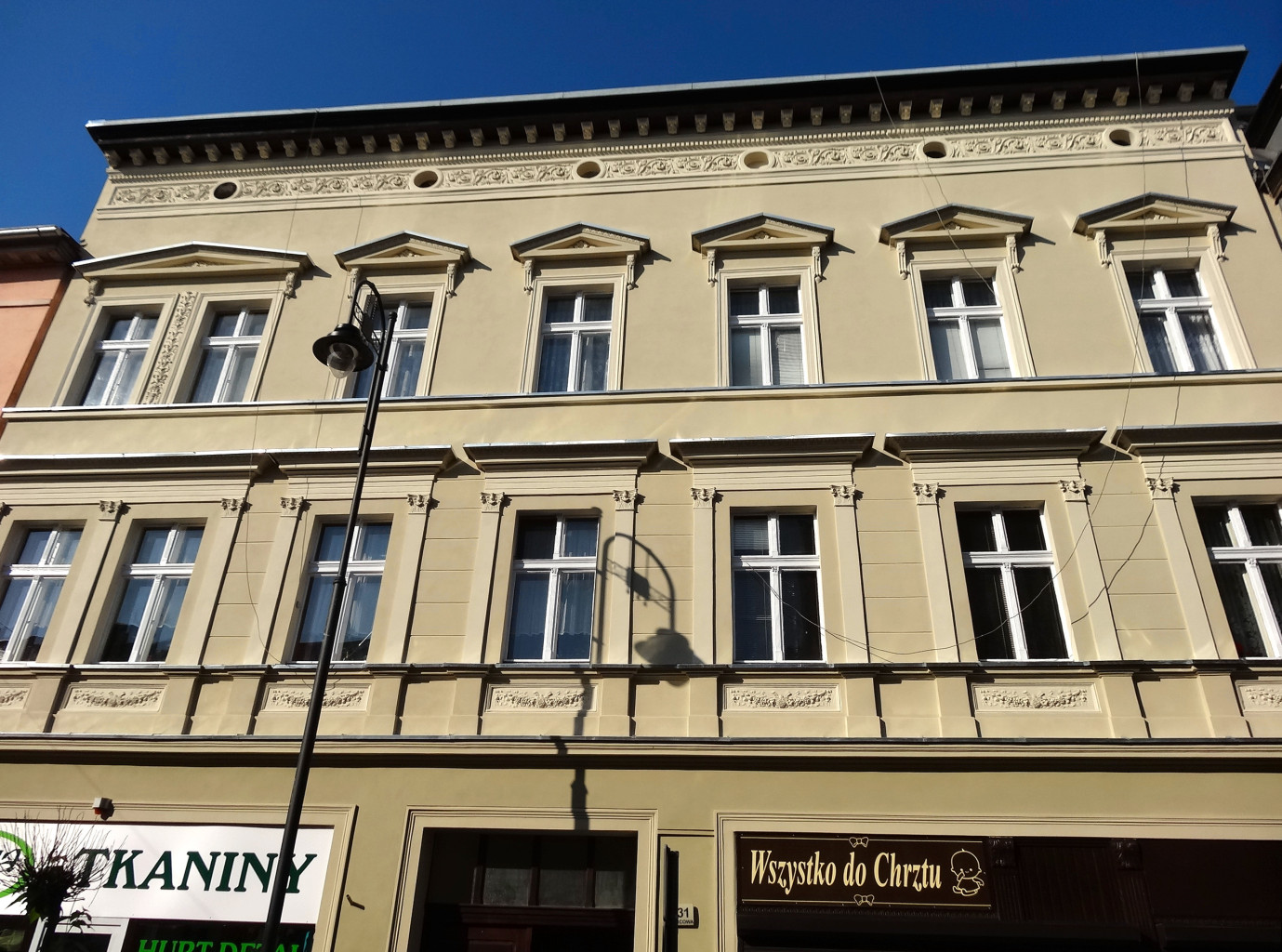
Facade on Dworcowa Street

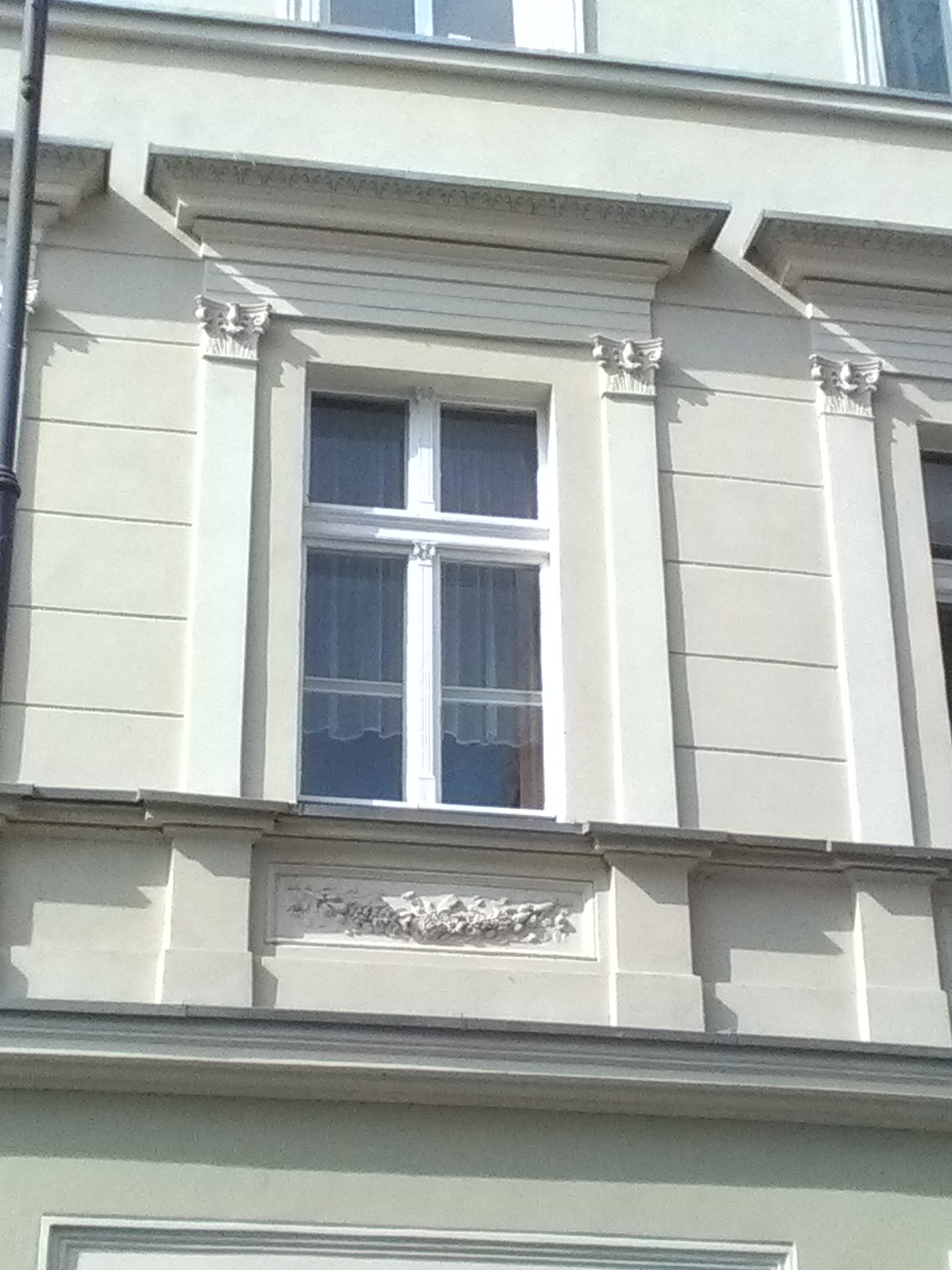
Adorned window

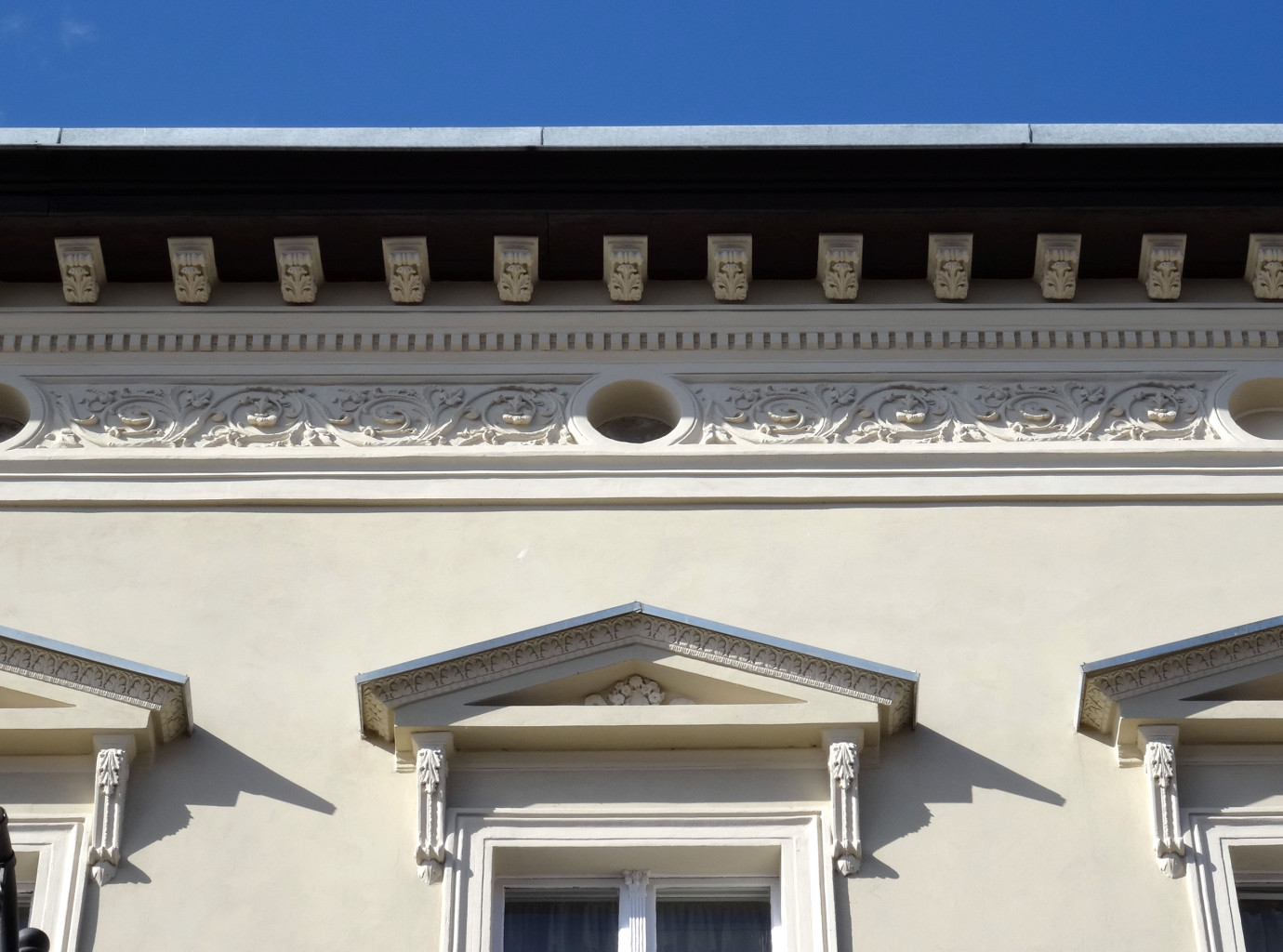
Detail of the frieze and table corbel

=== Antonie Bomrente Tenement at 33 ===
1891, by Fritz Weidner

Neo-Renaissance

Antonie Bomrente, a cooper, was the first owner of the actual building until World War I. It was then located at Bahnhofstraße 14: the facade still bears this initial numbering.

Many architectural details are still present on the building: above the gate, dividers, symbol of architecture, are set above a small barrel, recalling the profession of the first landlord. Two slight avant-corps balanced each side of the edifice. On the first floor, the middle part is enhanced by flanking pilasters with rosettes topped by a balustrade. Corbel tables crowns the facade, the ensemble is overlooked by a series of gable wall dormer.

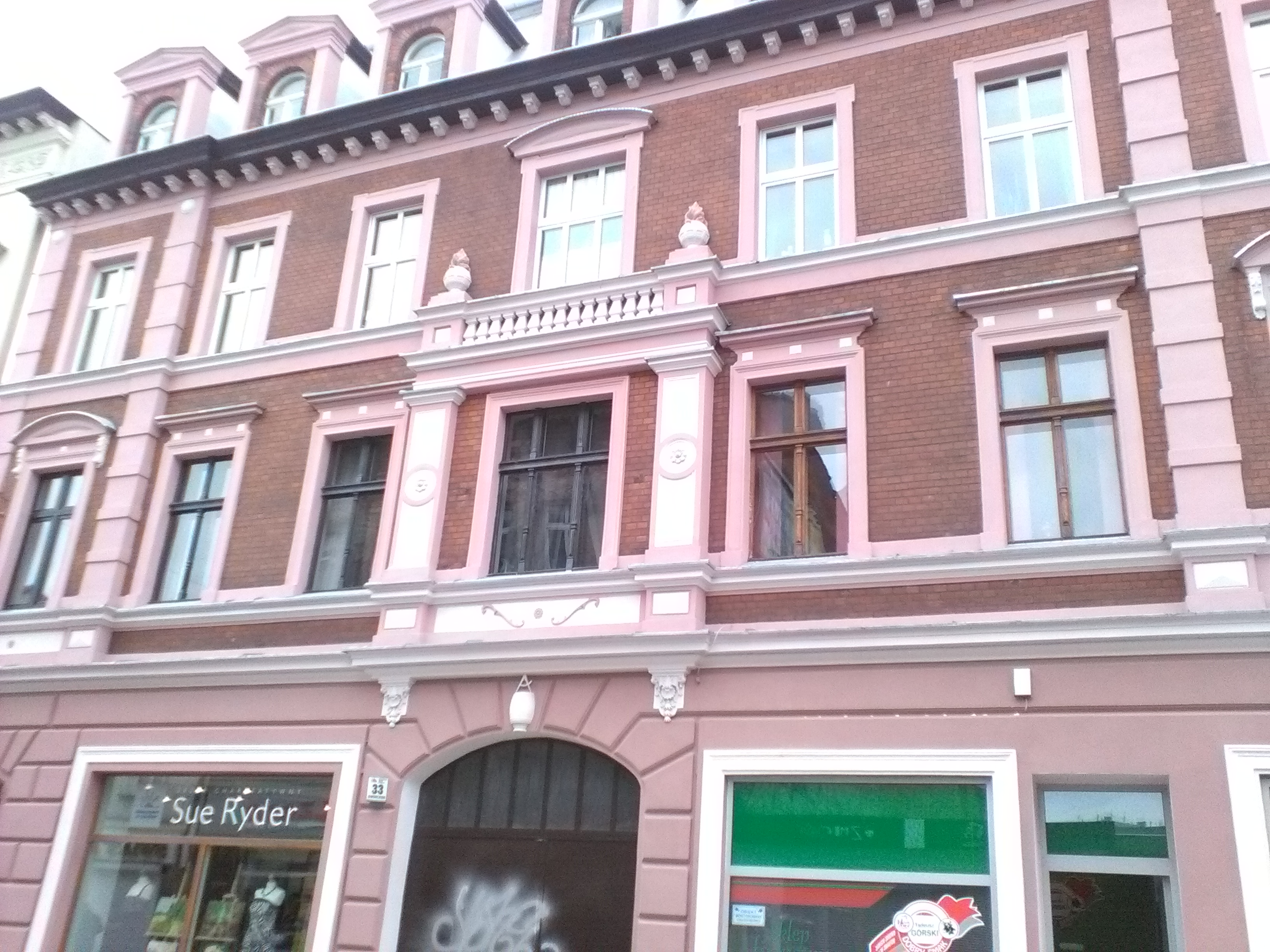
Facade on Dworcowa Street

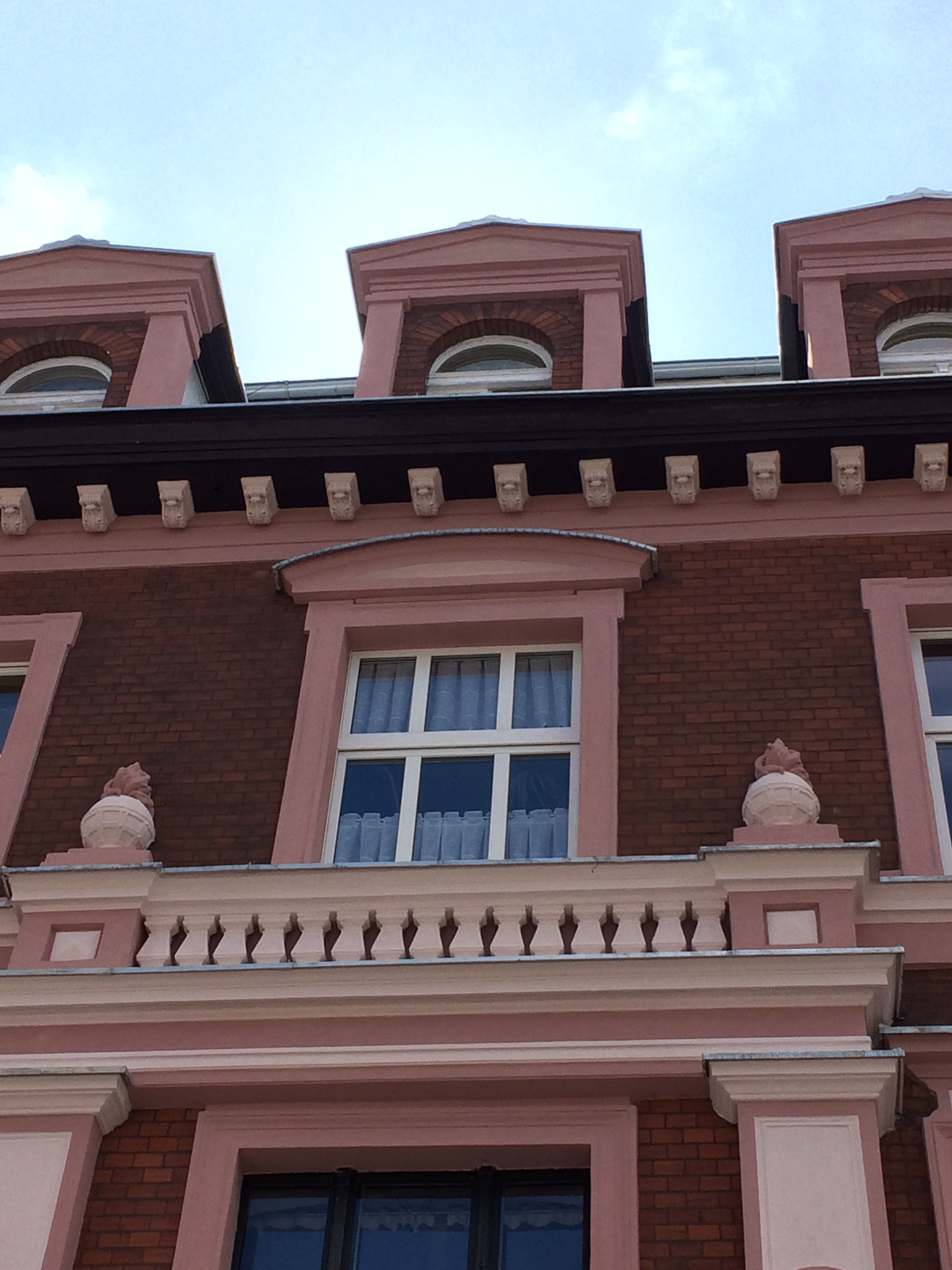
Balustrade and pilasters

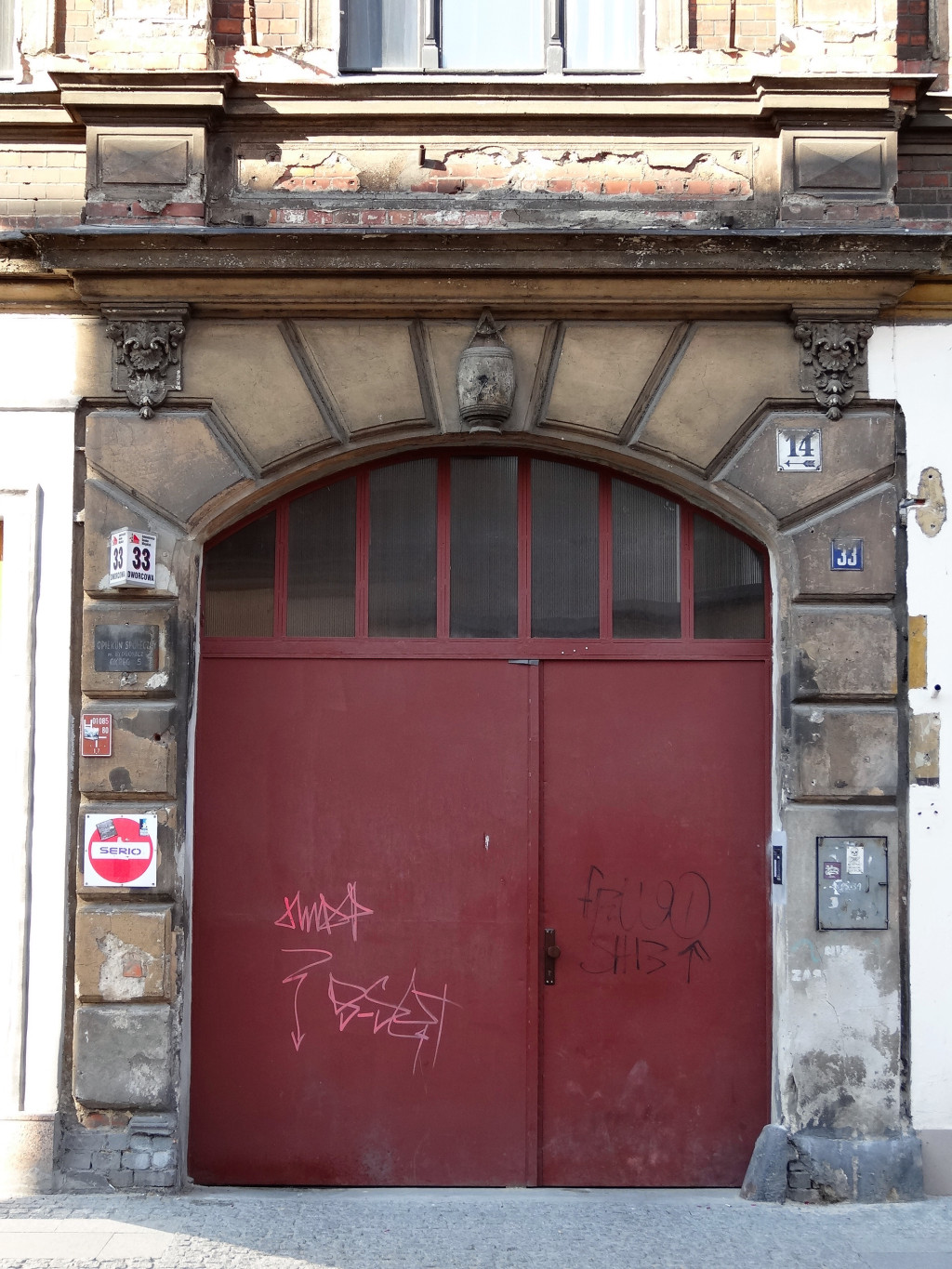
Entry porch, Nr.14 is the old Prussian street numeration

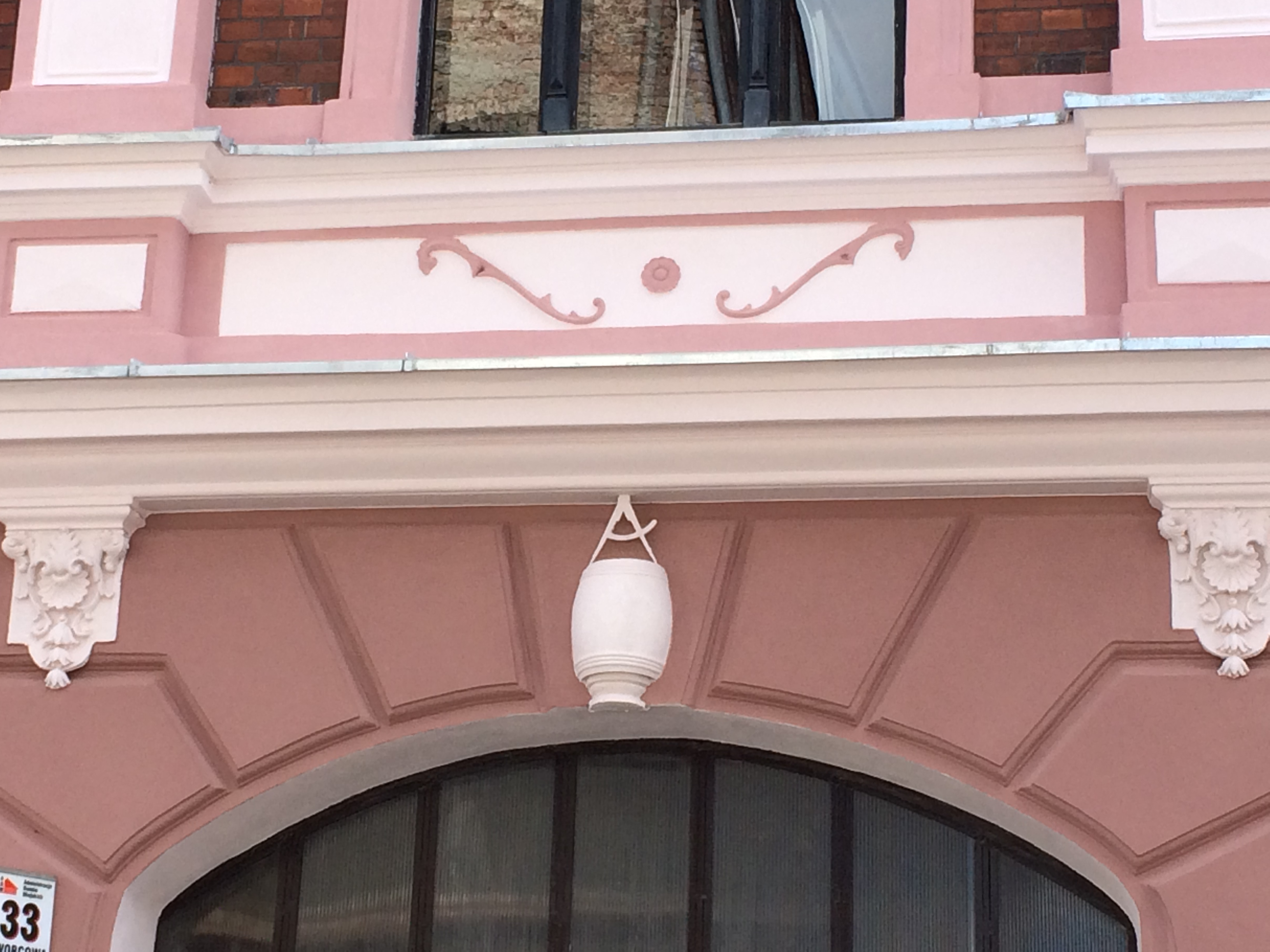
Detail of the portal, with dividers and barrel symbols.

=== Tenement at 35 ===
1875-1900

Eclecticism

First reference of Bahnhofstraße 15 is made around 1870, with Louis Gosdynski, a rentier, as owner. In 1900, building's property moved to Wilhelhm Zweiniger, a furrier.

The facade on Dworcowa street shed light on the fact that initially the tenement has been designed as two different houses, Nr.15 & 15a. There is clearly a divide between the left part bending on Neo-Renaissance style (symmetry, naked walls, flat roof) and the right one inclining on eclecticist diversity (balconies, bossage wall, cartouche decoration, mansard roof).

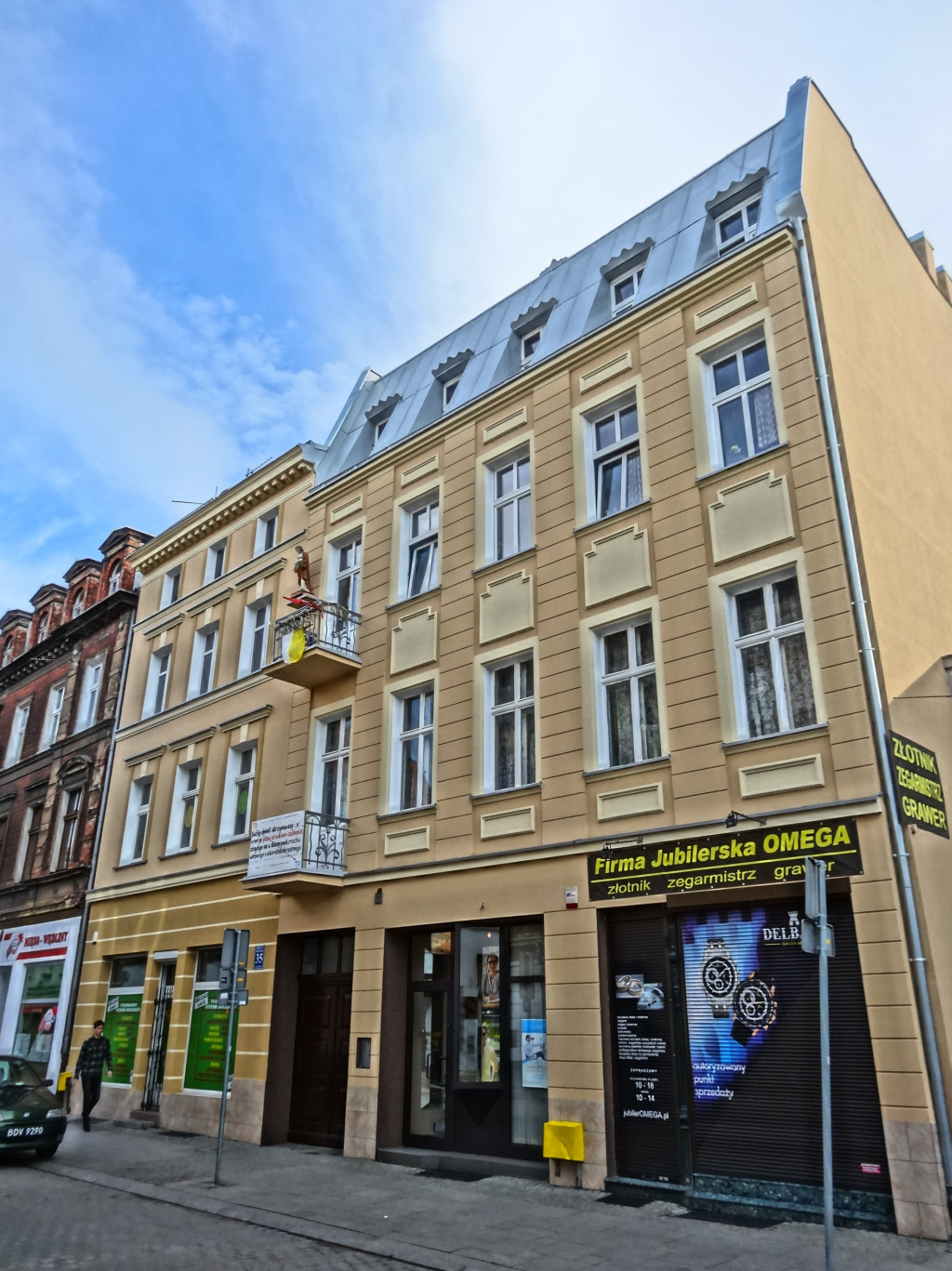
Facade on Dworcowa Street

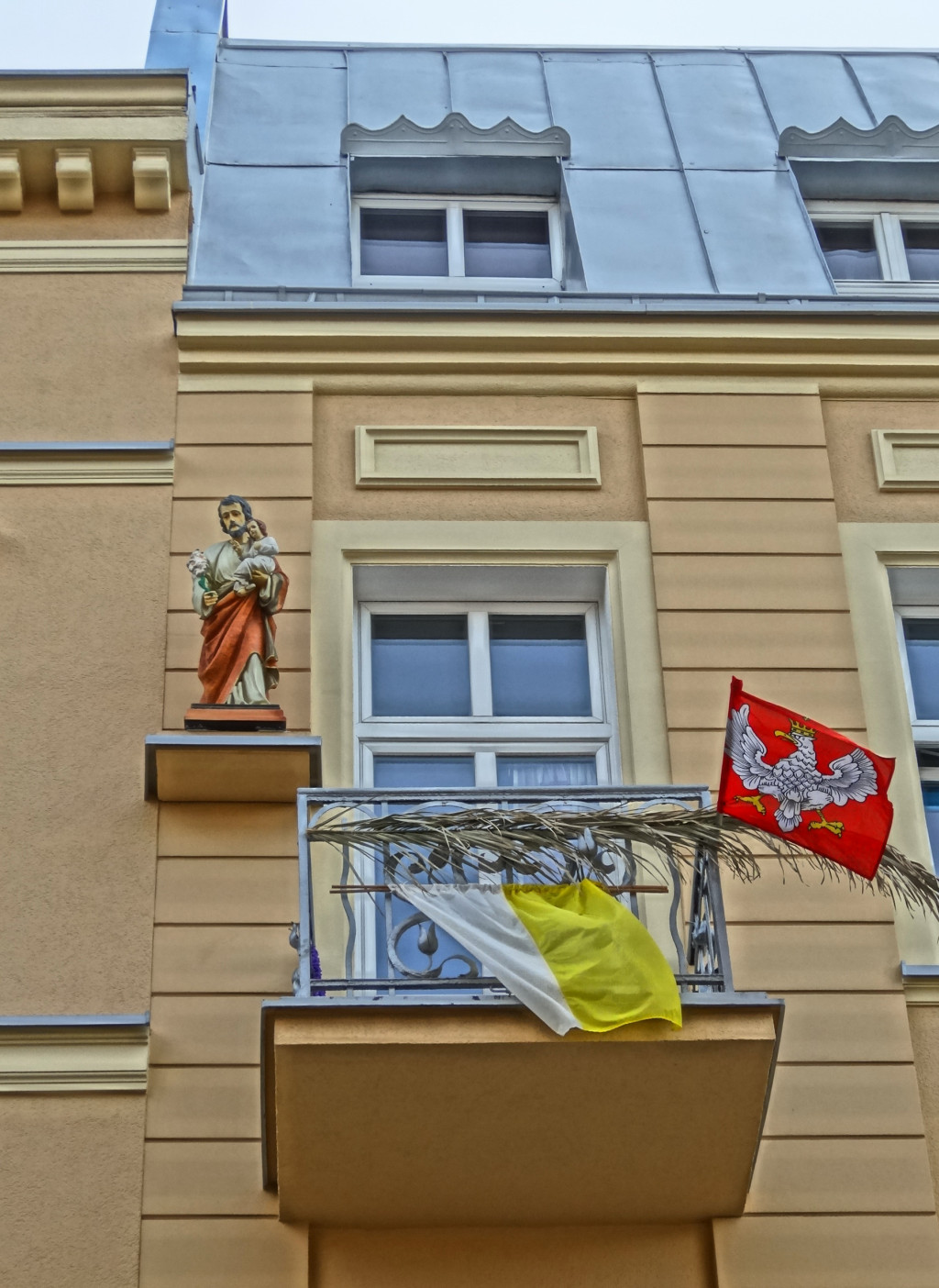
Detail of a balcony

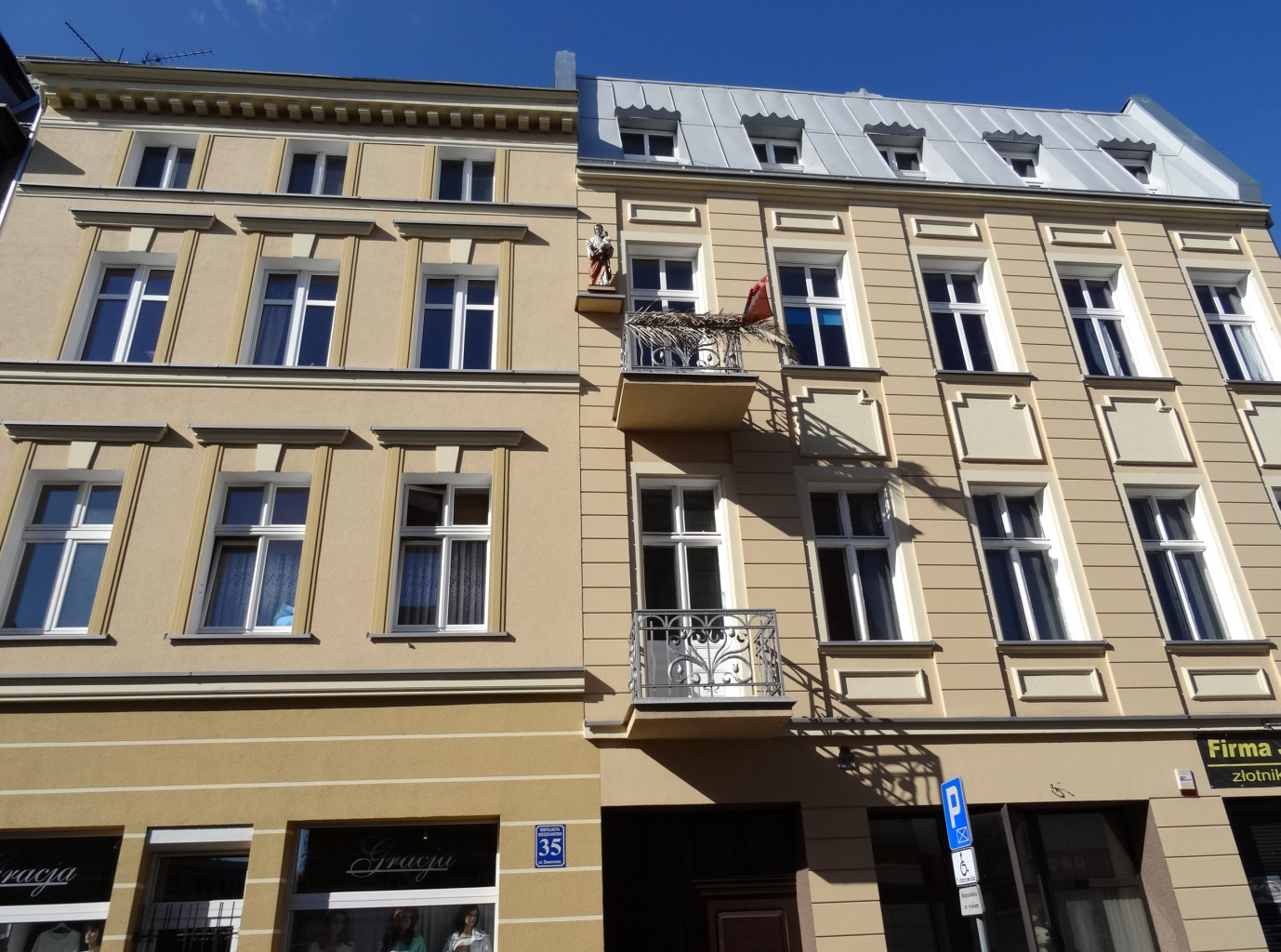
Two facades- two different styles

=== Aleksander Theil Tenement at 39, corner with Marcinkowskiego street ===
1890, by Józef Święcicki

Neo-Renaissance

The house at then Bahnhofstraße 17 was commissioned by Alexander Theil, a rentier living at Gammstraße 14. The building housed on the ground floor three shops, each with a small apartment in the back and the upper floors accommodated two four-room apartments.

The corner house is remarkable by the ornamental painting between the windows of the first floor of the elevation on Dworcowa street. The edifice is massive, but the richness of its ornaments and motifs help it having a certain lightness.

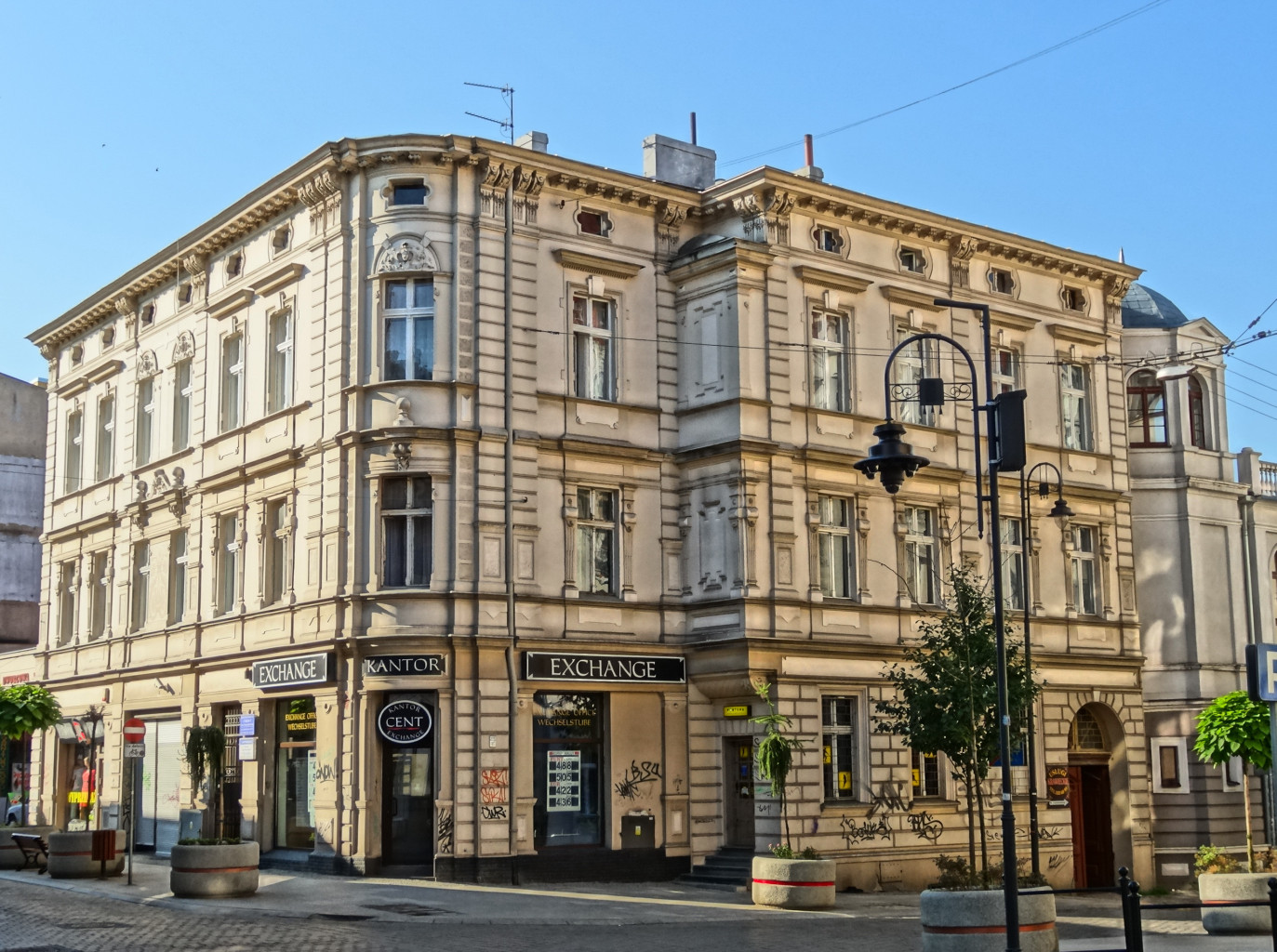
View of the tenement from the street

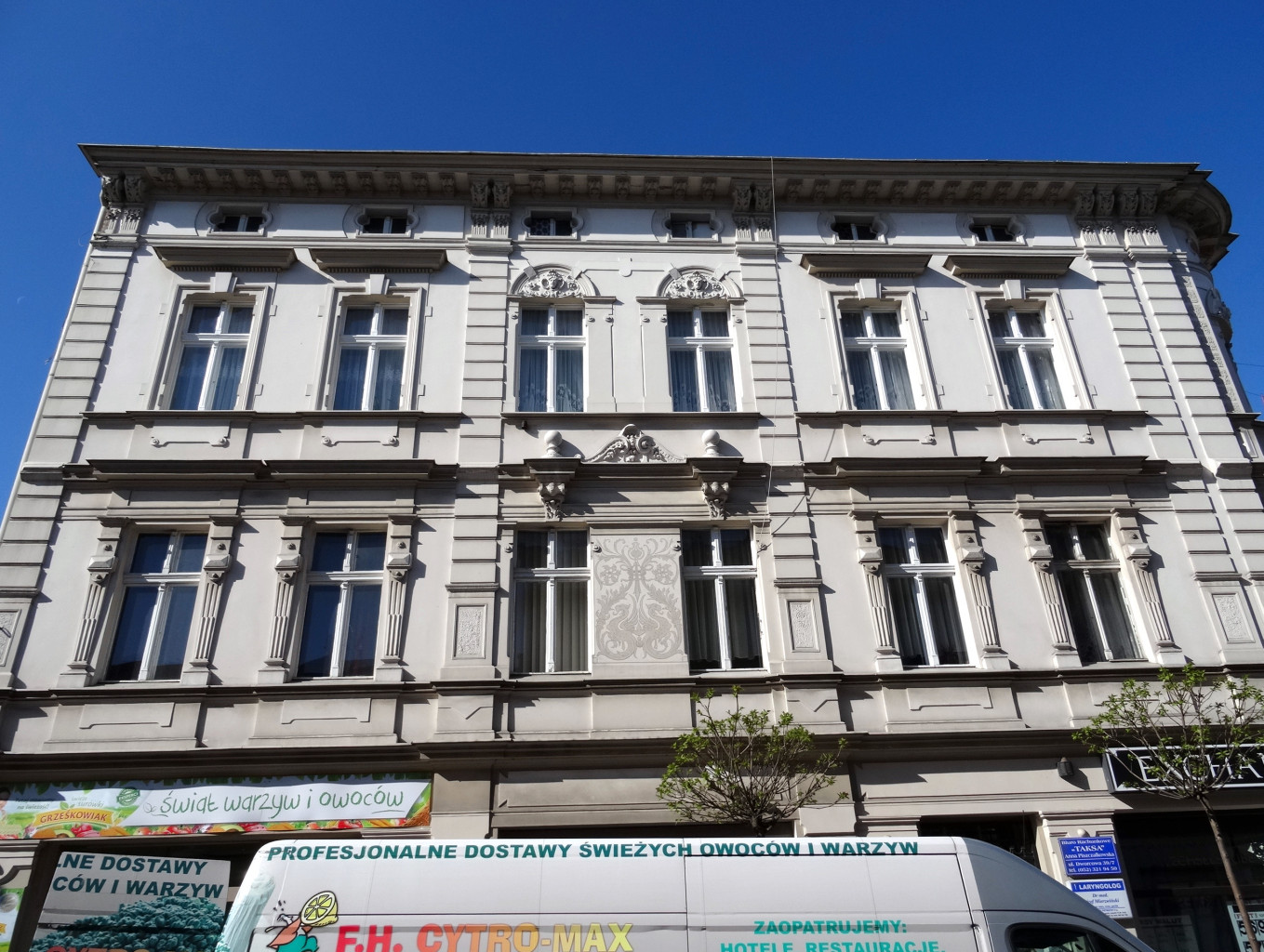
Facade on Dworcowa Street

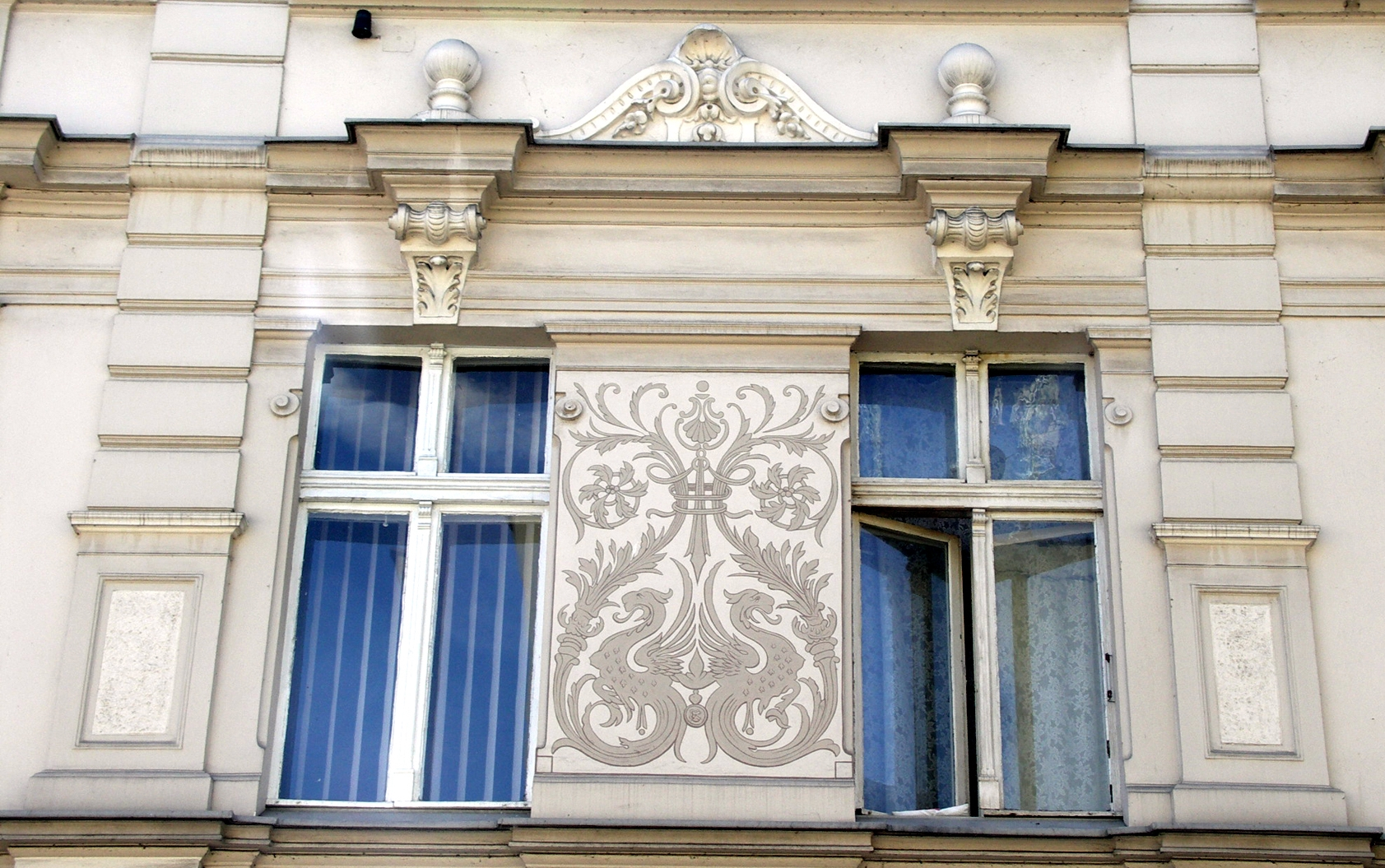
Detail of the painting on 1st florr

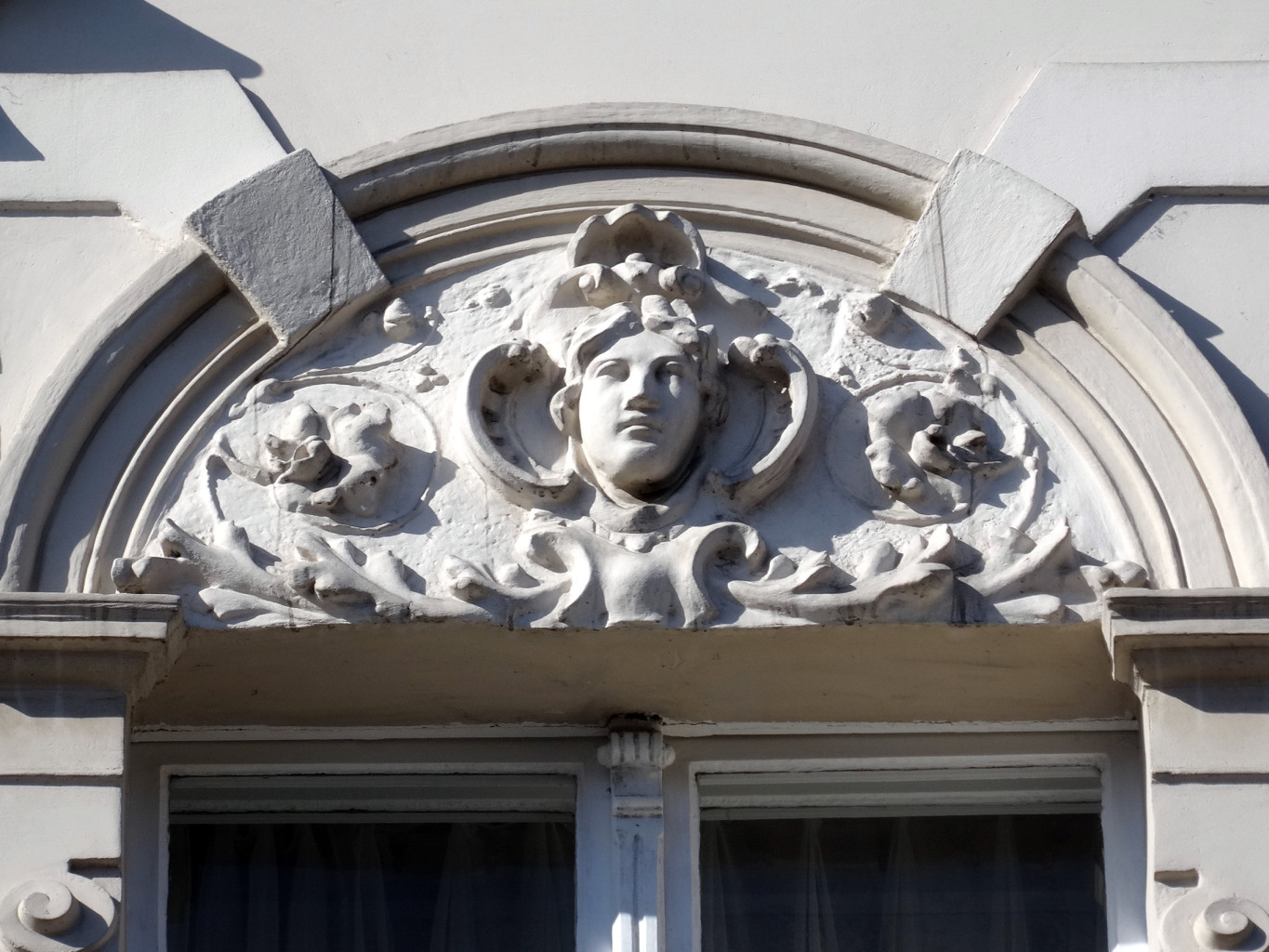
Detail of a pediment

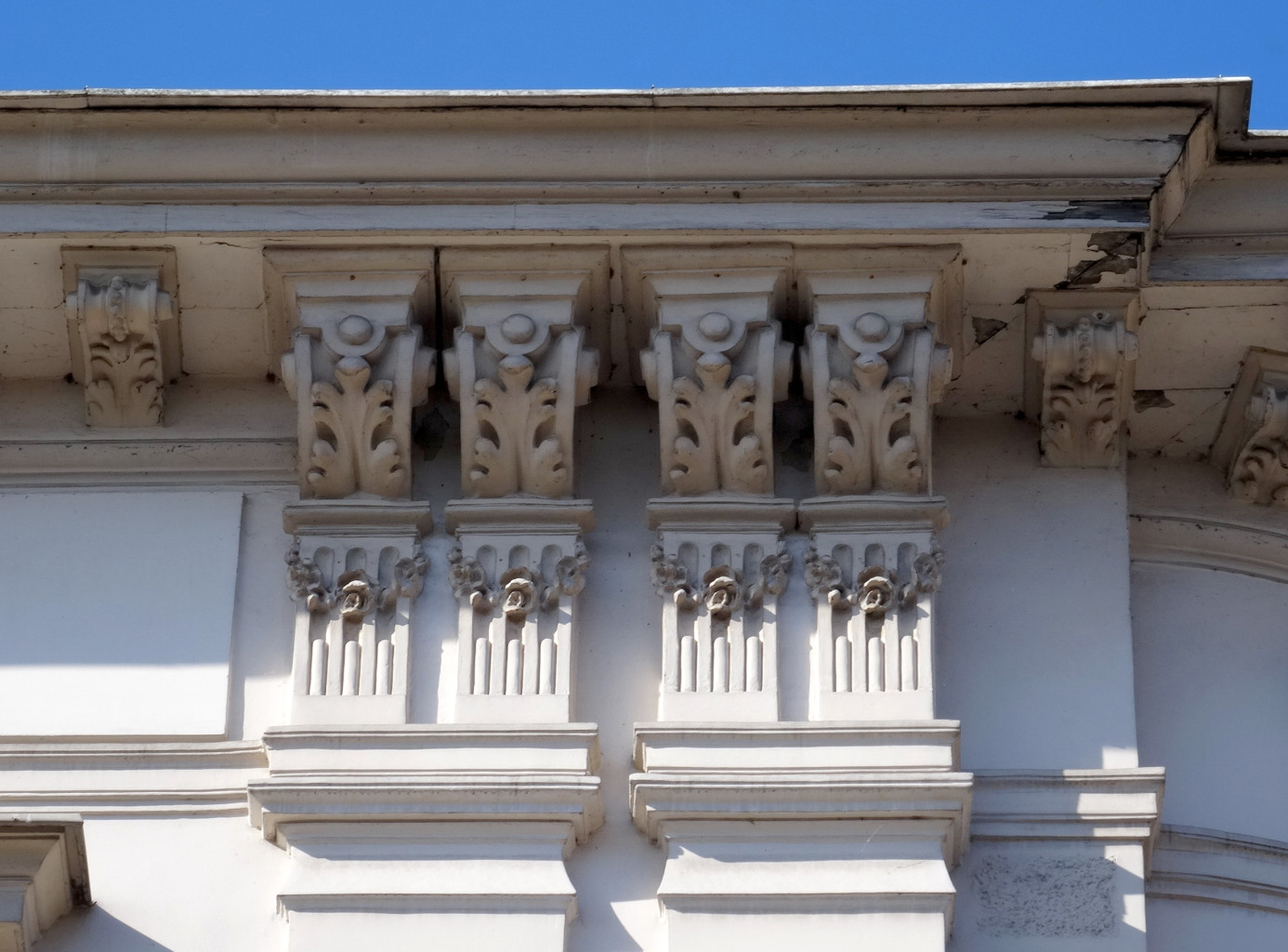
Detail of corbels

=== Schultz Tenement at 40 ===
1890

Eclecticism

This building, then at Bahnhofstraße 78, has been commissioned by the Schultz family, saddler masters. At the end of the 19th century a widow, Pauline Schultz, lived there, but her relatives owned the edifice until the outbreak of the second world war.

The house has been refurbished down to minute details in early 2018 One can admire the quality of the motifs: pilasters, rosettes, bossage on facade edges, balustrades, table corbel on top and a finely crafted winged helmet head of Hermes inside the pediment overlooking the main door.

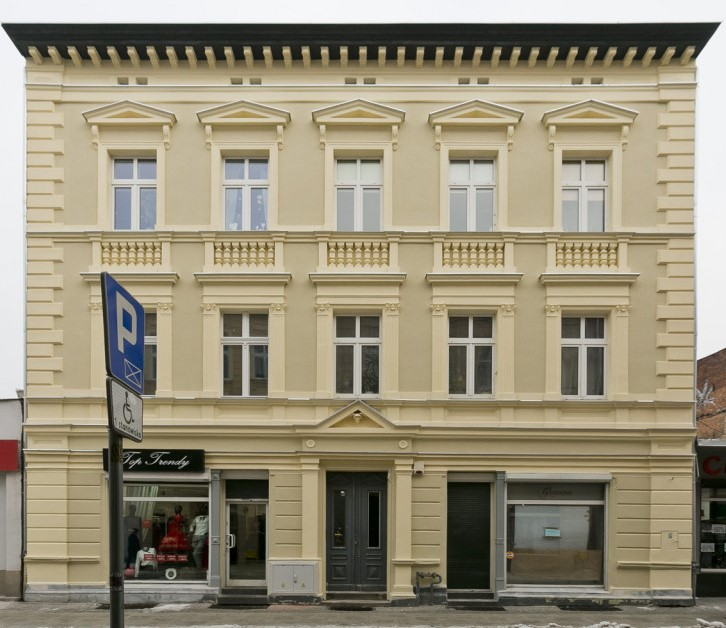
Renovated facade on Dworcowa Street

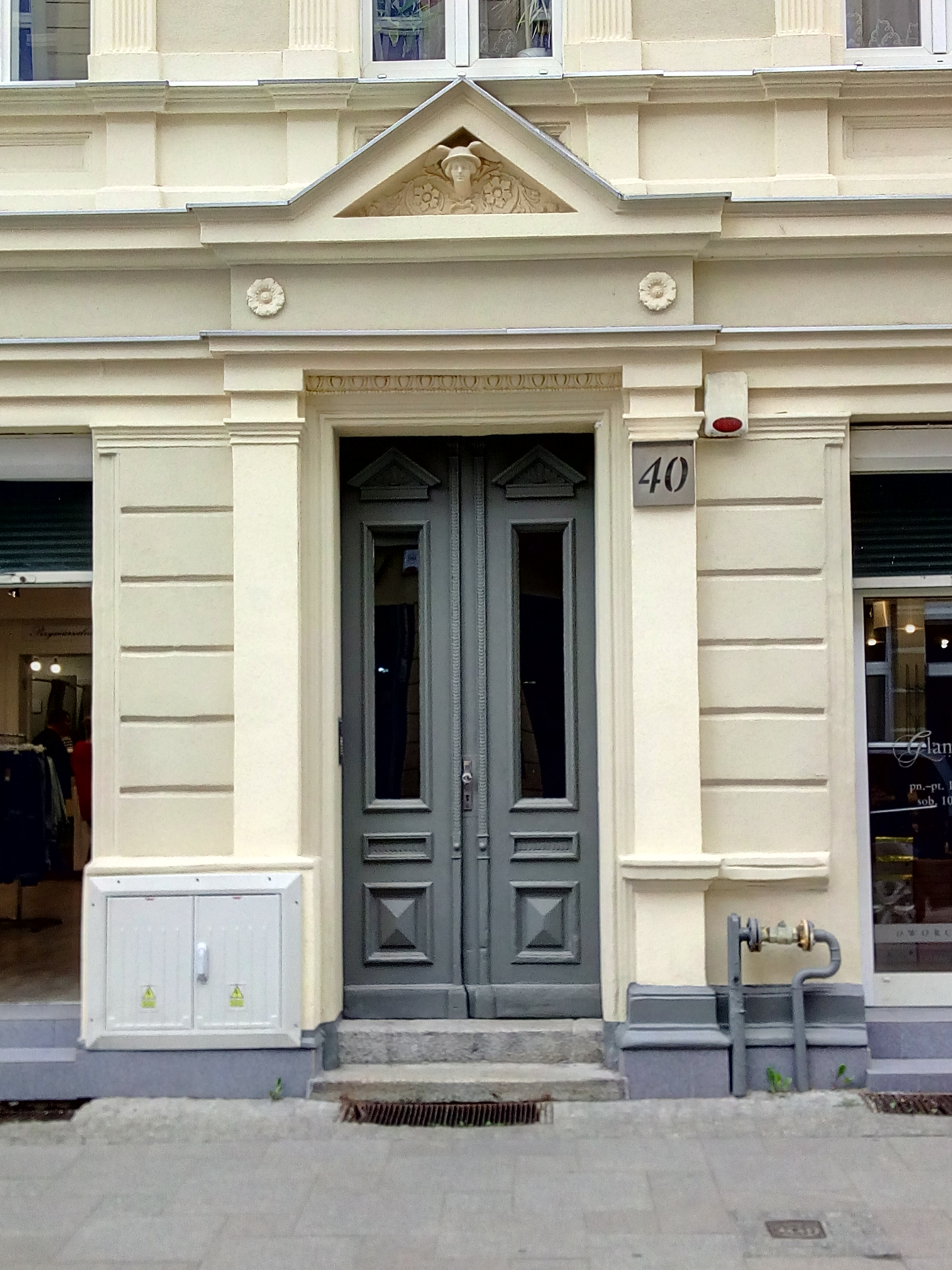
Portal

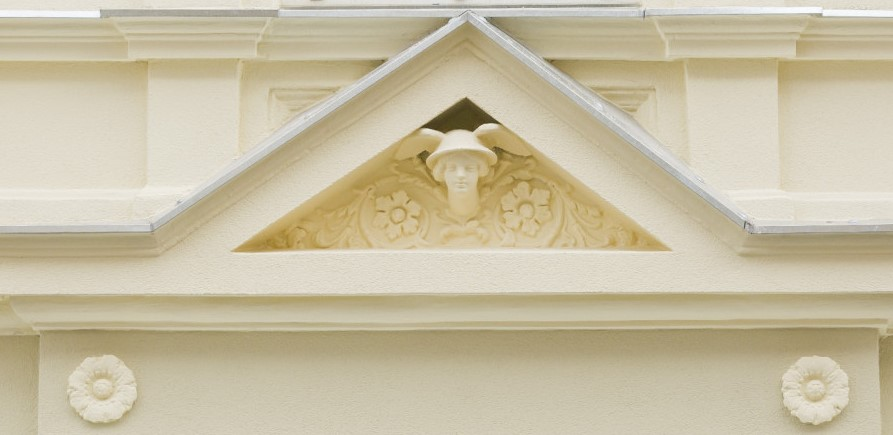
Adorned pediment

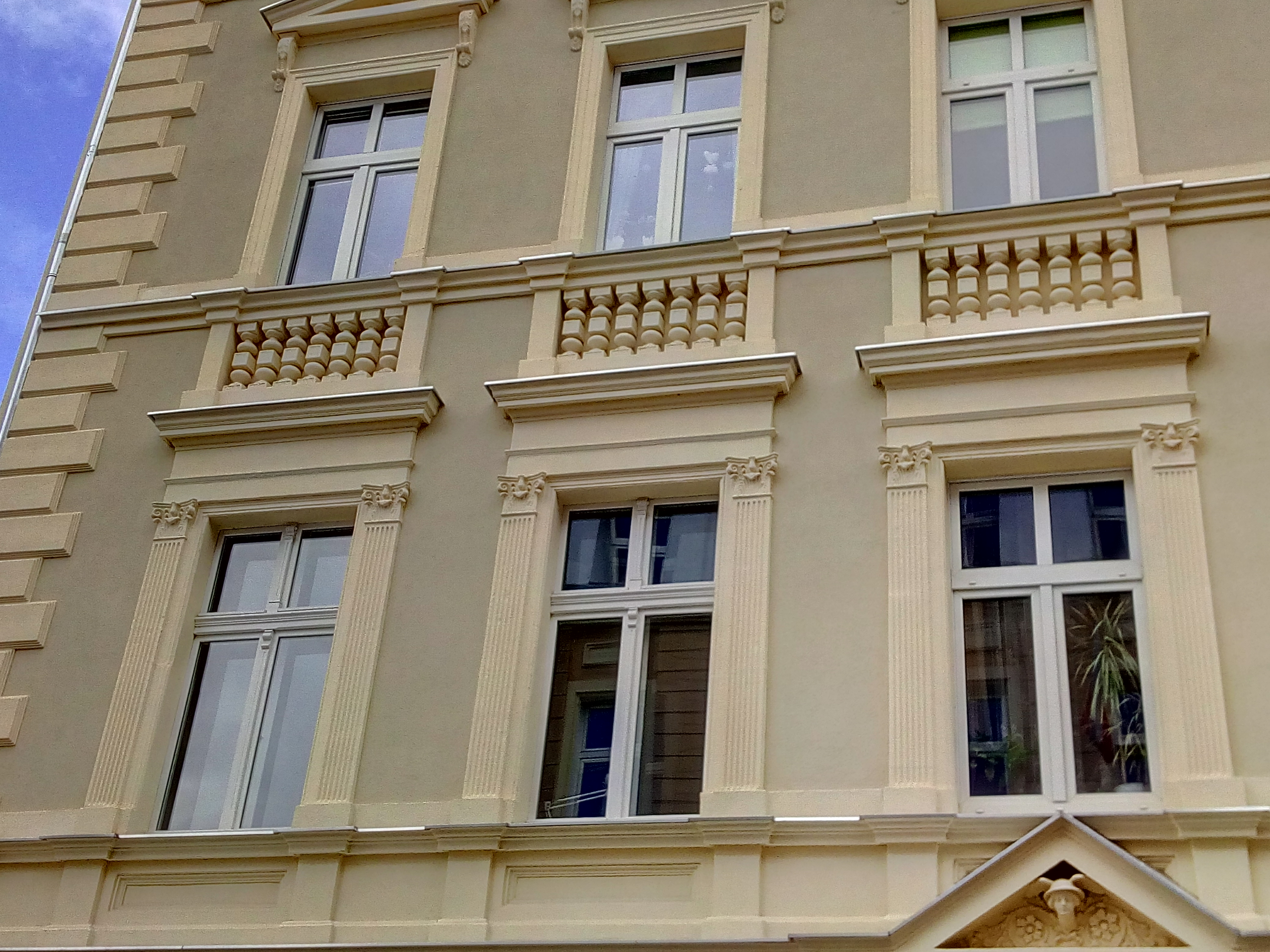
Detail of window decoration

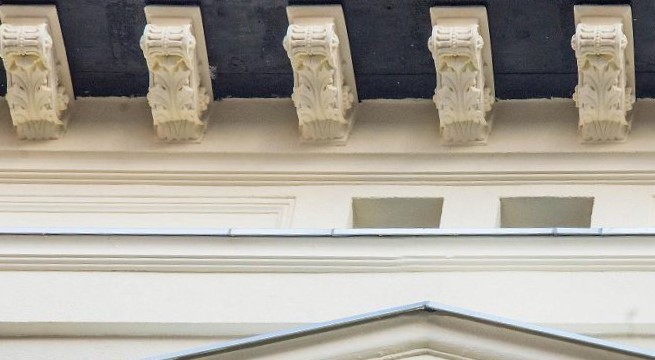
Corbel table

=== Tenement at 41, corner with Marcinkowskiego street ===
1904, by Erich Lindenburger

Eclecticism

Franz Muhme, a mason, was the first owner of the actual building then at Bahnhofstraße 18: he was mainly renting rooms. In the 1910s, the house was divided into five properties, which landlords were: Mr. Meyer and Mr Giefe, rentiers not living in Bromberg, Hermann Lemke, a baker who had his shop there, Jahnke Jr., an engineer and Wilhelm Tornow, a mechanic.

Facades, renovated in 2015, have Neo-Baroque and early Modernism elements. The architect varied the effects to render the asymmetry: bay window, corner terrace and balconies, cartouches, eyelid dormer on the corner but a row of shed dormers on the roof giving onto Dworcowa Street. The house lost one of its corner tower during a fire.

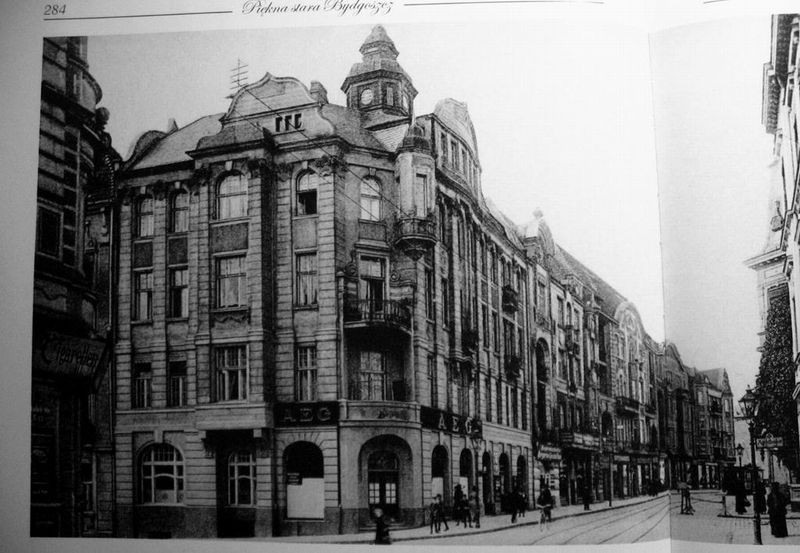
View ca 1930

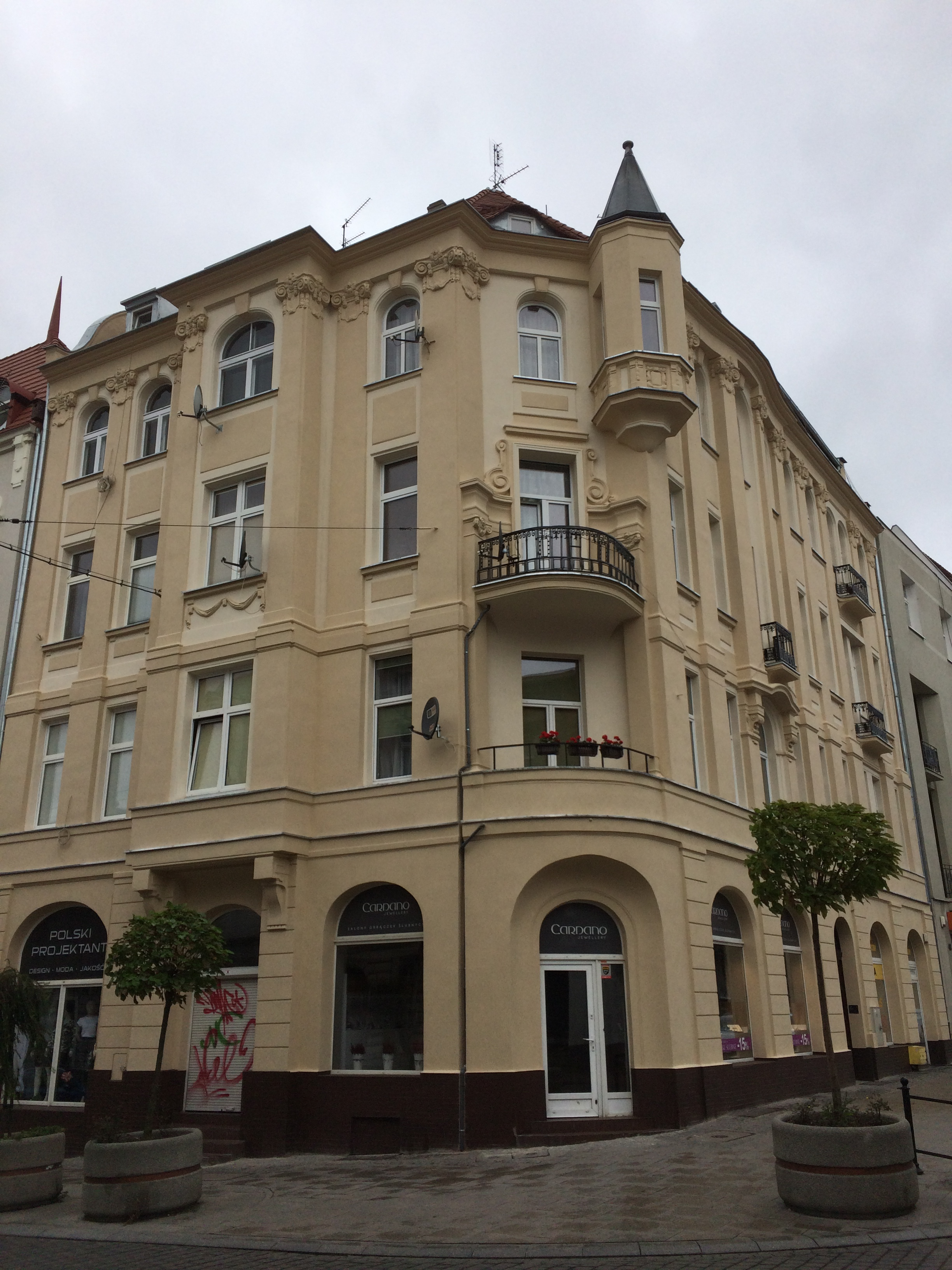
Facades on Dworcowa and Marcinkowski Street

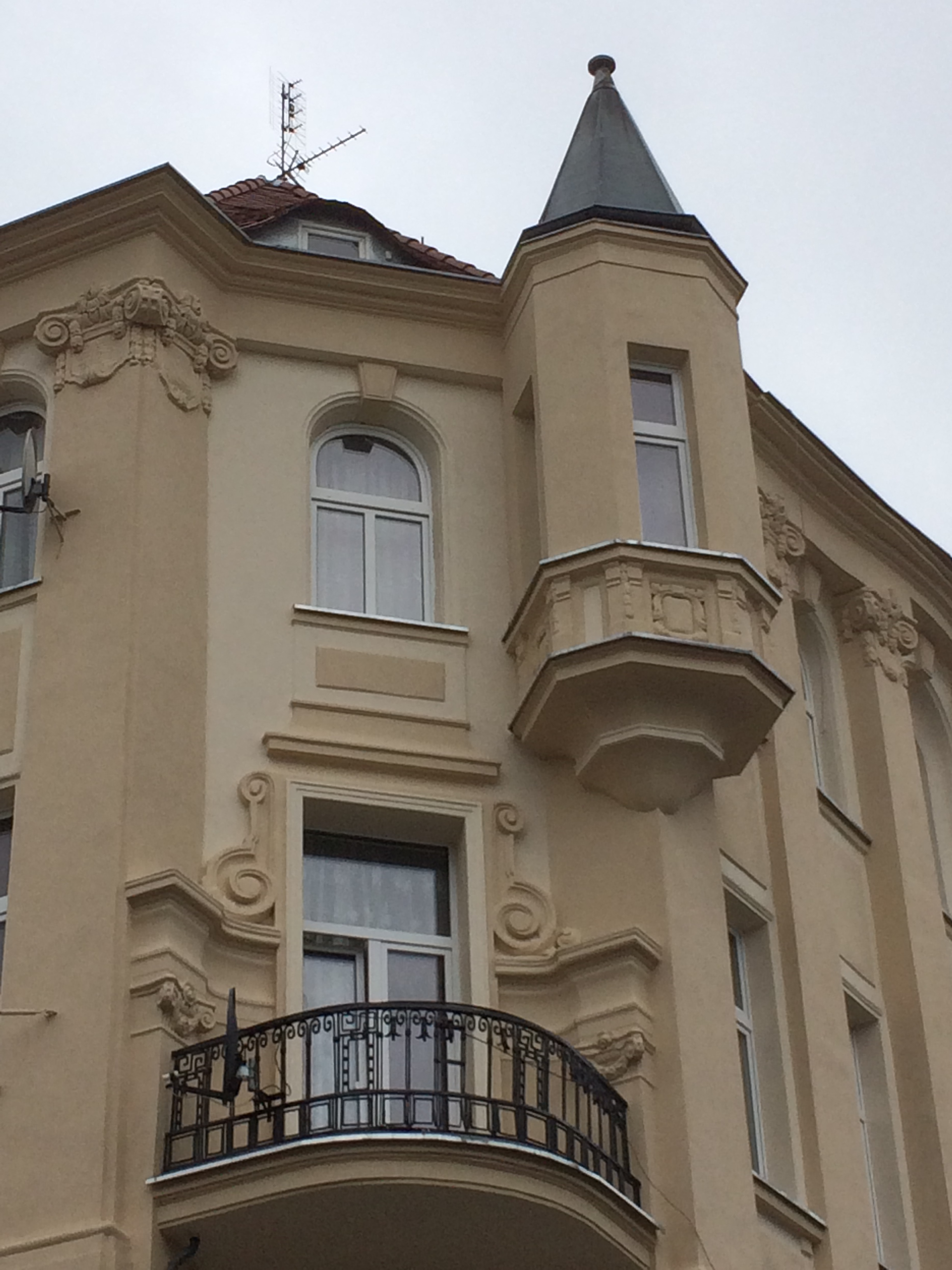
Detail of the corner tower

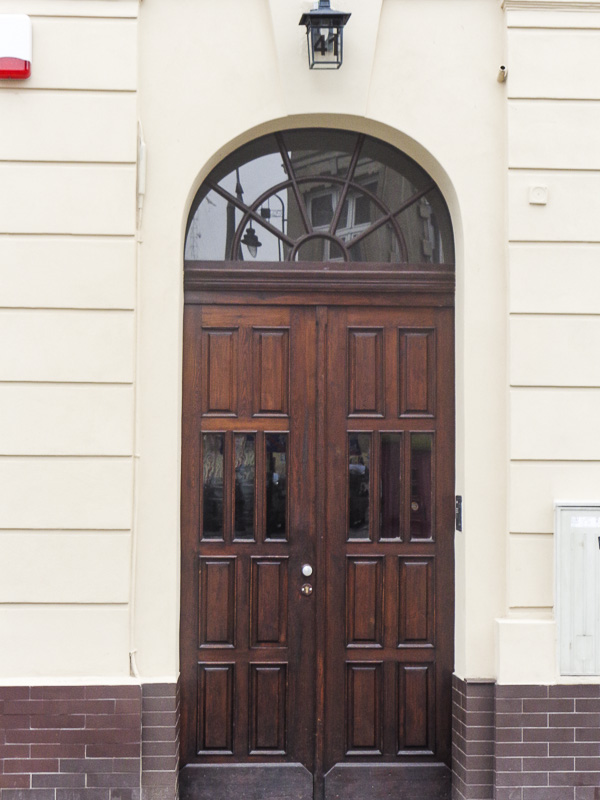
Main gate

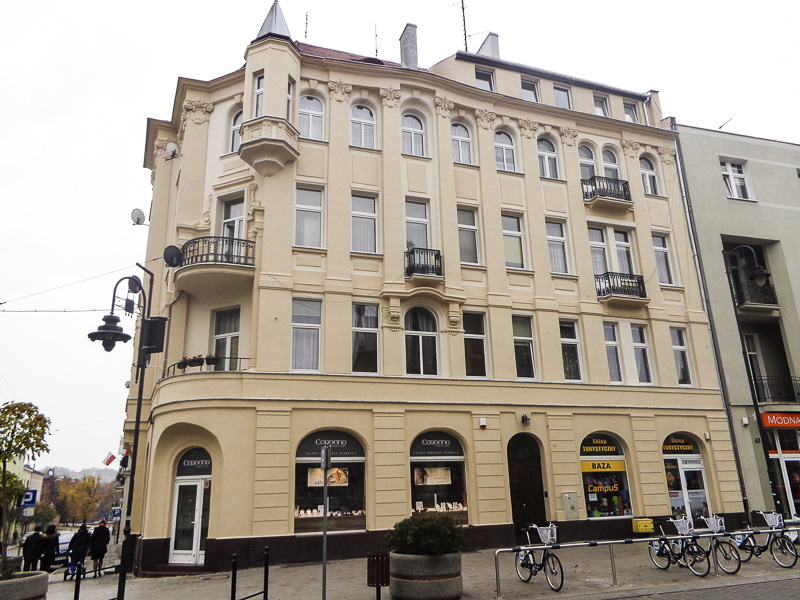
Elevation on Dworcowa street

=== Willy Grawunder Tenement at 45 ===
1906, by Erich Lindenburger

Secession

The house, then at Bahnhofstraße 19, has been commissioned by Willy Grawunder, a merchant running a hardware store/perfumery in the premises. At the end of the 1920s, Willy Jahr, successful owner of a bicycle factory at Nakielska street 89, opened there a selling point for his production.

Facade compositions include loggias and balconies highlighted with wavy ornamented pilasters. The portal is also adorned with a wavy oval, similar to Art Nouveau townhouses in Munich. Eric Lindenburger used similar motifs for house at Nr.417 and at 3 Adam Mickiewicz.

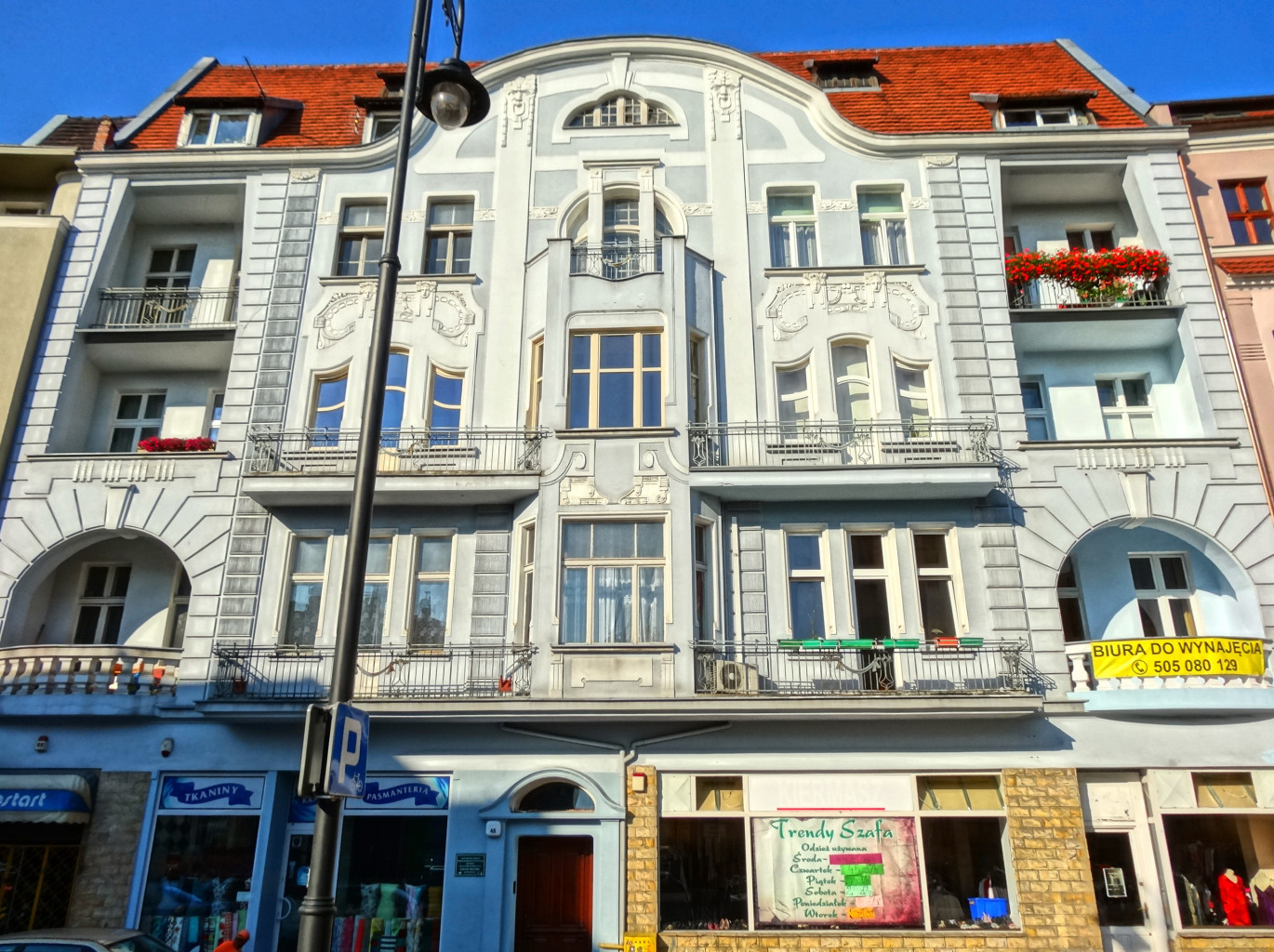
Facade on Dworcowa Street

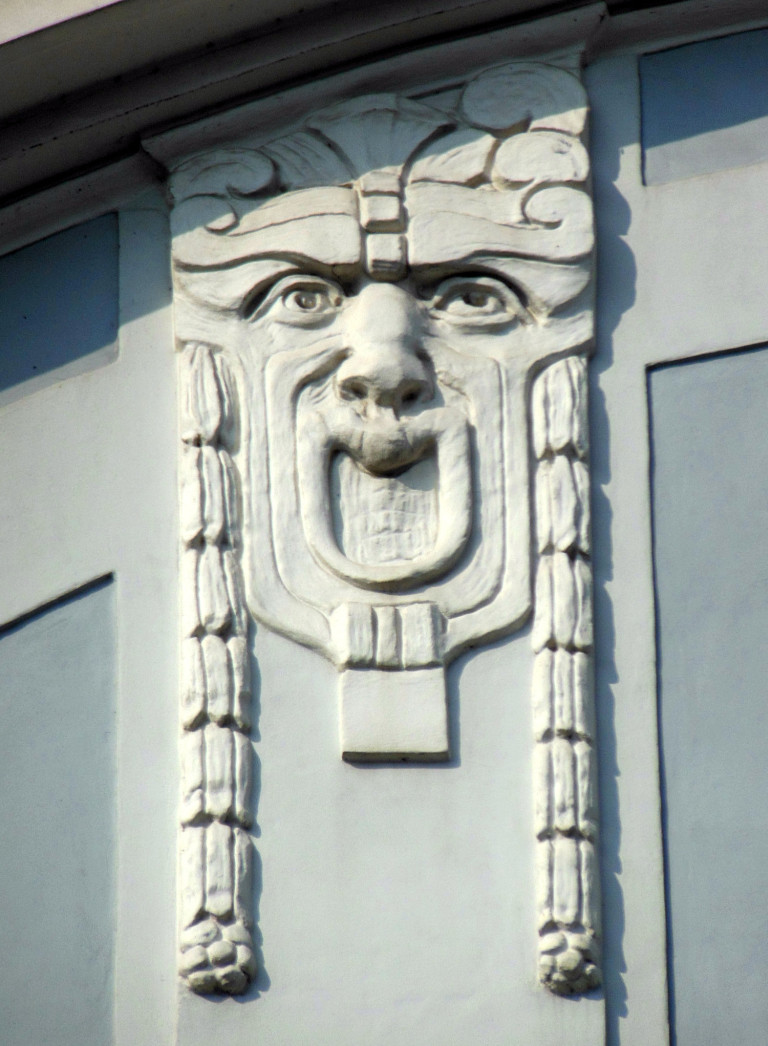
Detail of a masque

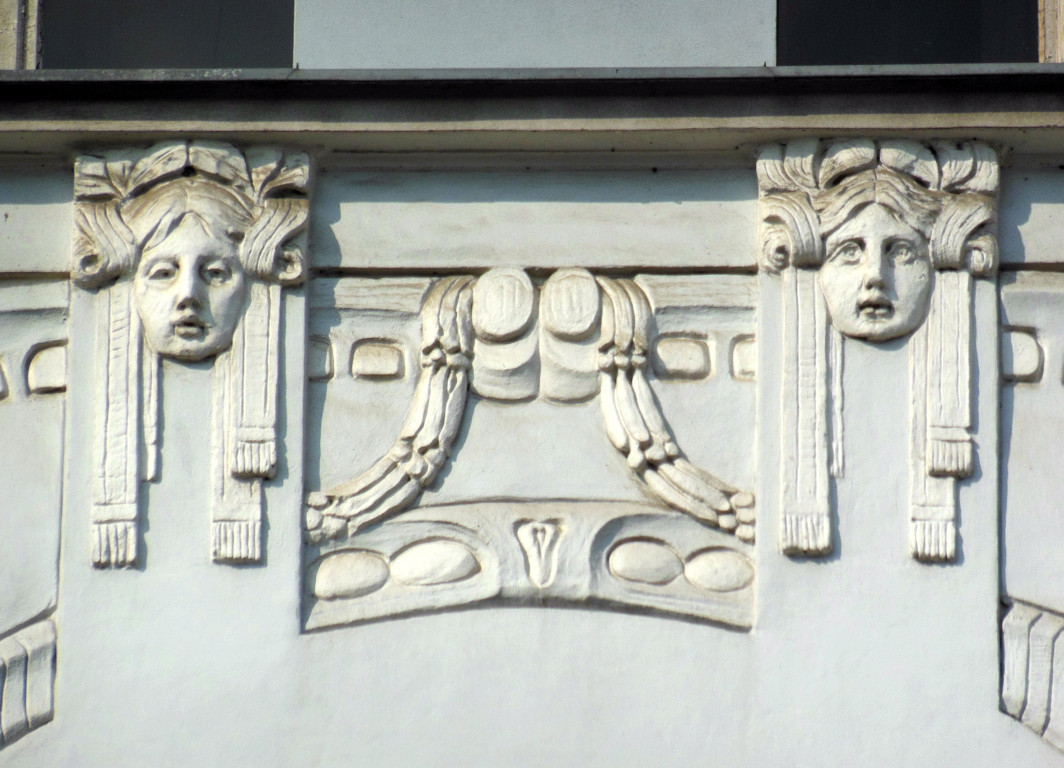
Art Nouveau motifs

=== Bruno Grawunder Tenement at 47 ===
1905, by Erich Lindenburger

Eclecticism, Munich Secession elements

Bruno Grawunder, a jeweler, supposedly a relative of Wilhelm at Nr.45, had this house built at then Bahnhofstraße 20.

The compositions on elevation include bow windows topped by balconies, loggias plus especially highlighted cartouches and a grand frieze elements deployed like square boards on top of the facade. Interiors materials are partly original woodwork and stained glass.

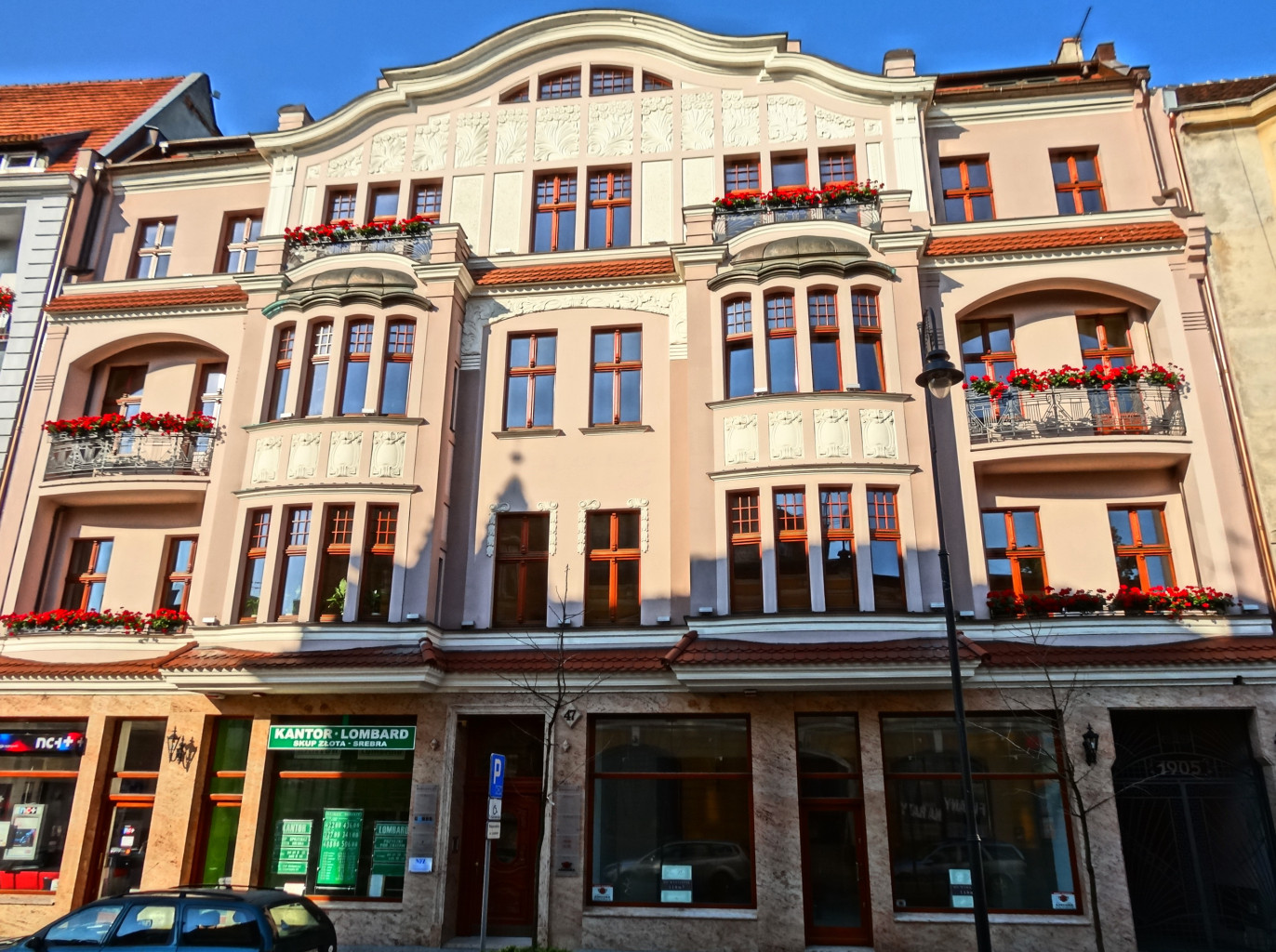
Facade on Dworcowa Street

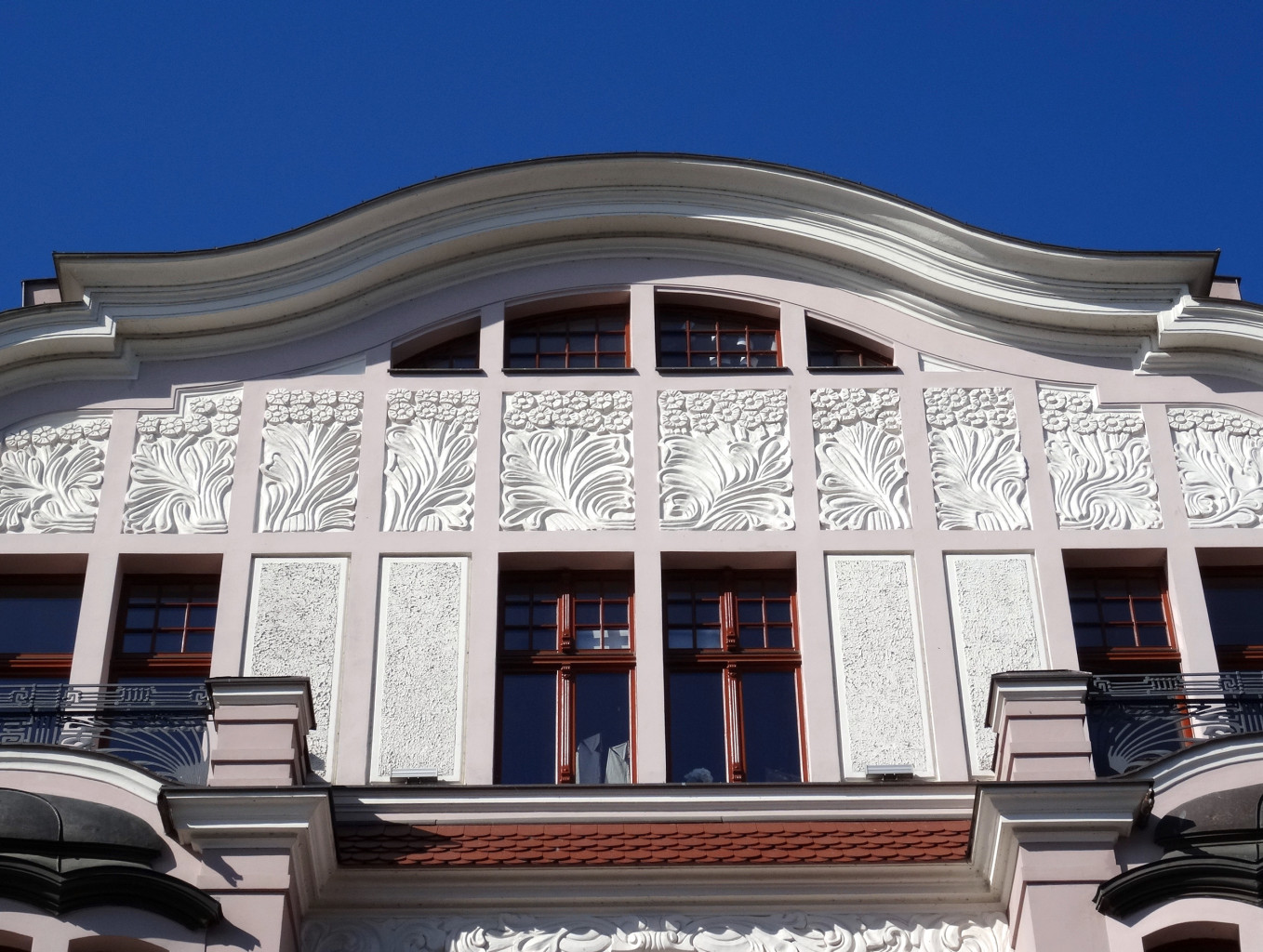
Frieze elements

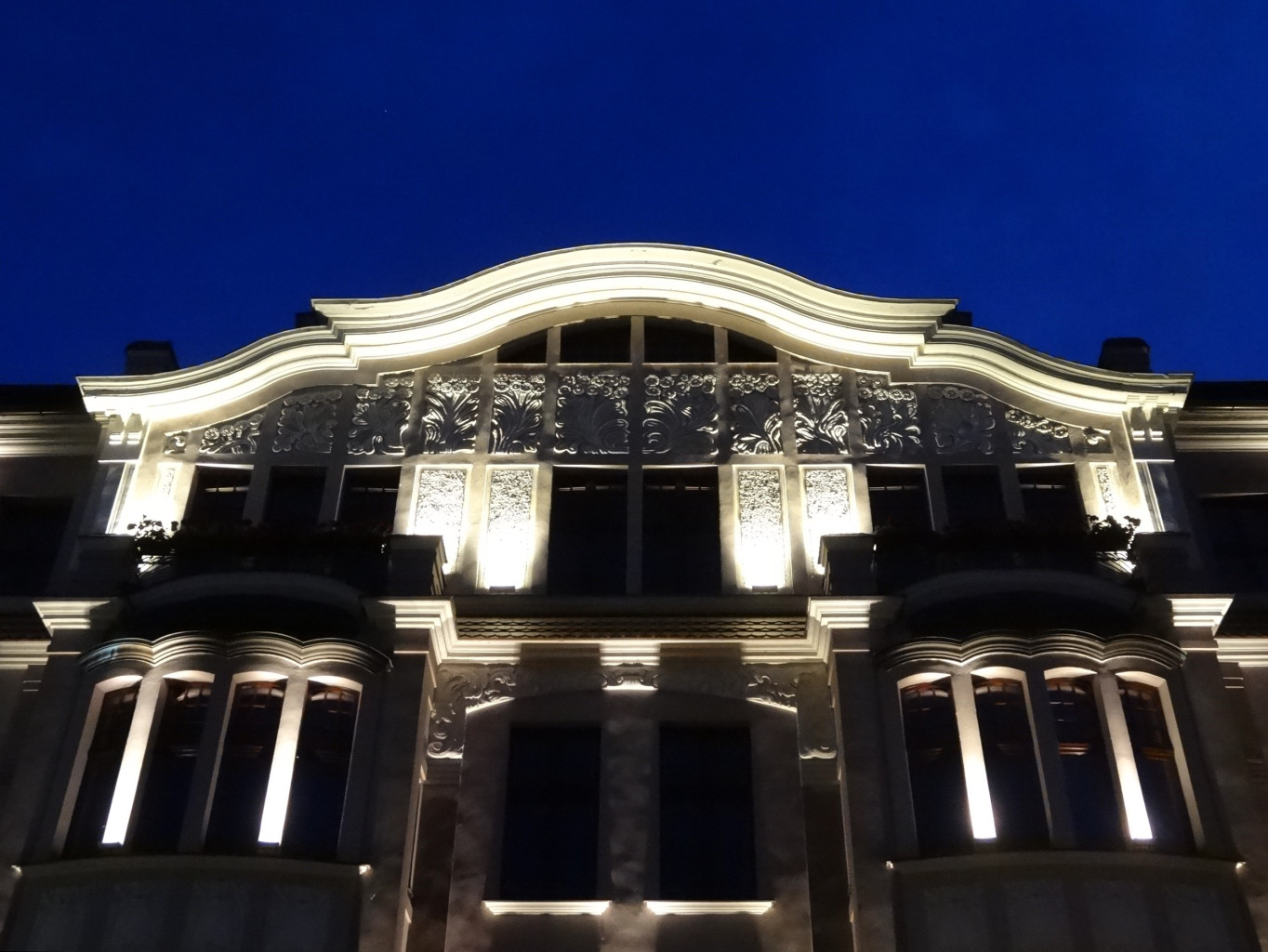
By night

=== Tenement at 48, corner with Sienkiewicza street ===
1875-1900

Eclecticism

Bahnhofstraße 74 has been built in the early 1880s by Rob. Tuchscker, a pharmacist. He opened there his pharmacy, Kronen Apotheke, one of the few in the city at the time. A new pharmacist, Emil Affeldt, took over the firm at the same place from 1900 until the end of the 1920s.

Beautifully restored in 2018, the corner tenement displays two symmetric facades with a neo-classic style and a wrought iron balcony on its corner.

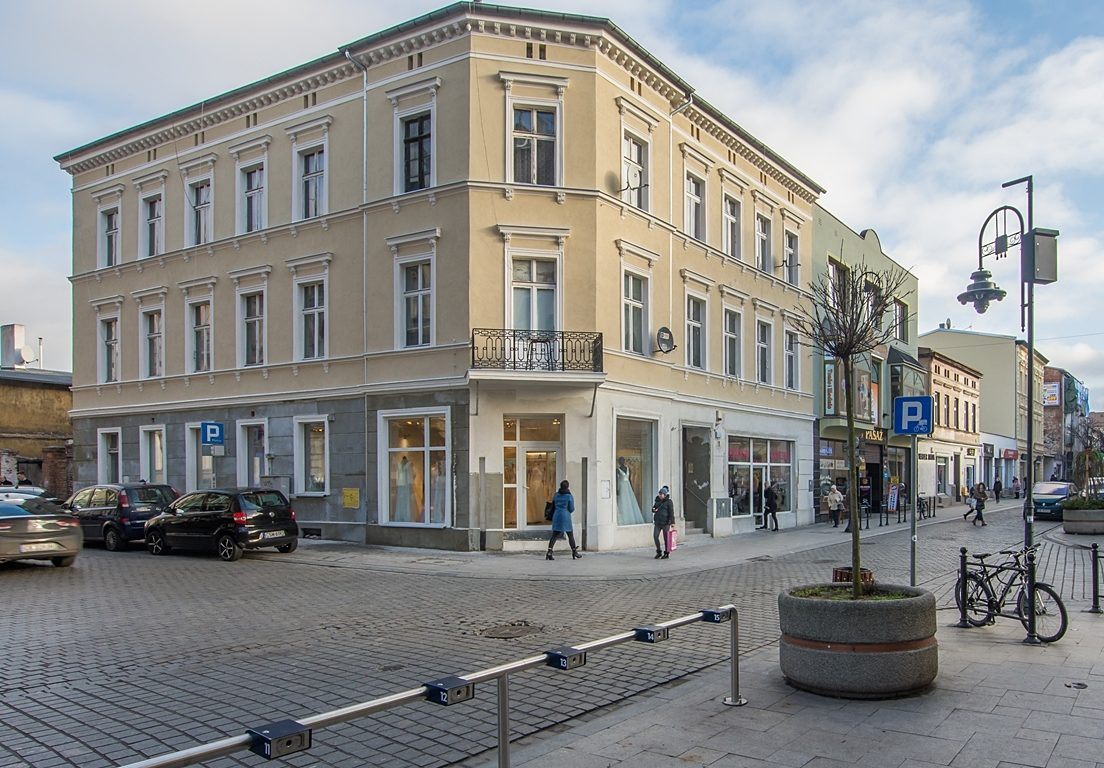
Renovated facade on Dworcowa and Sienkiewicza Streets

=== Tenement at 49 ===
1908

Secession

Friedrich Heller, the first owner, was running a wine and spirit shop there (Bahnhofstraße 21). After WW I, Wilhelm Tornow had been running a growing bike factory there, renamed "Tornedo" in 1924.

The main elevation is remarkable for its wrought iron balconies, and also for the ornamented cartouches on bay windows and facade. Ornaments include figures of woman, stylized lion, garlands and other vegetal motifs specific to Art Nouveau.

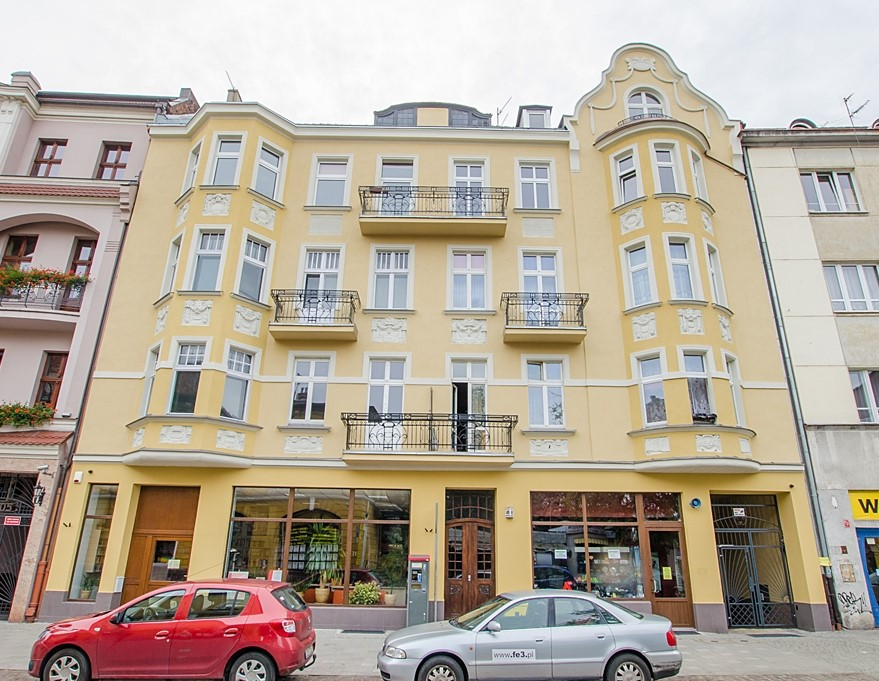
Facade on Dworcowa Street

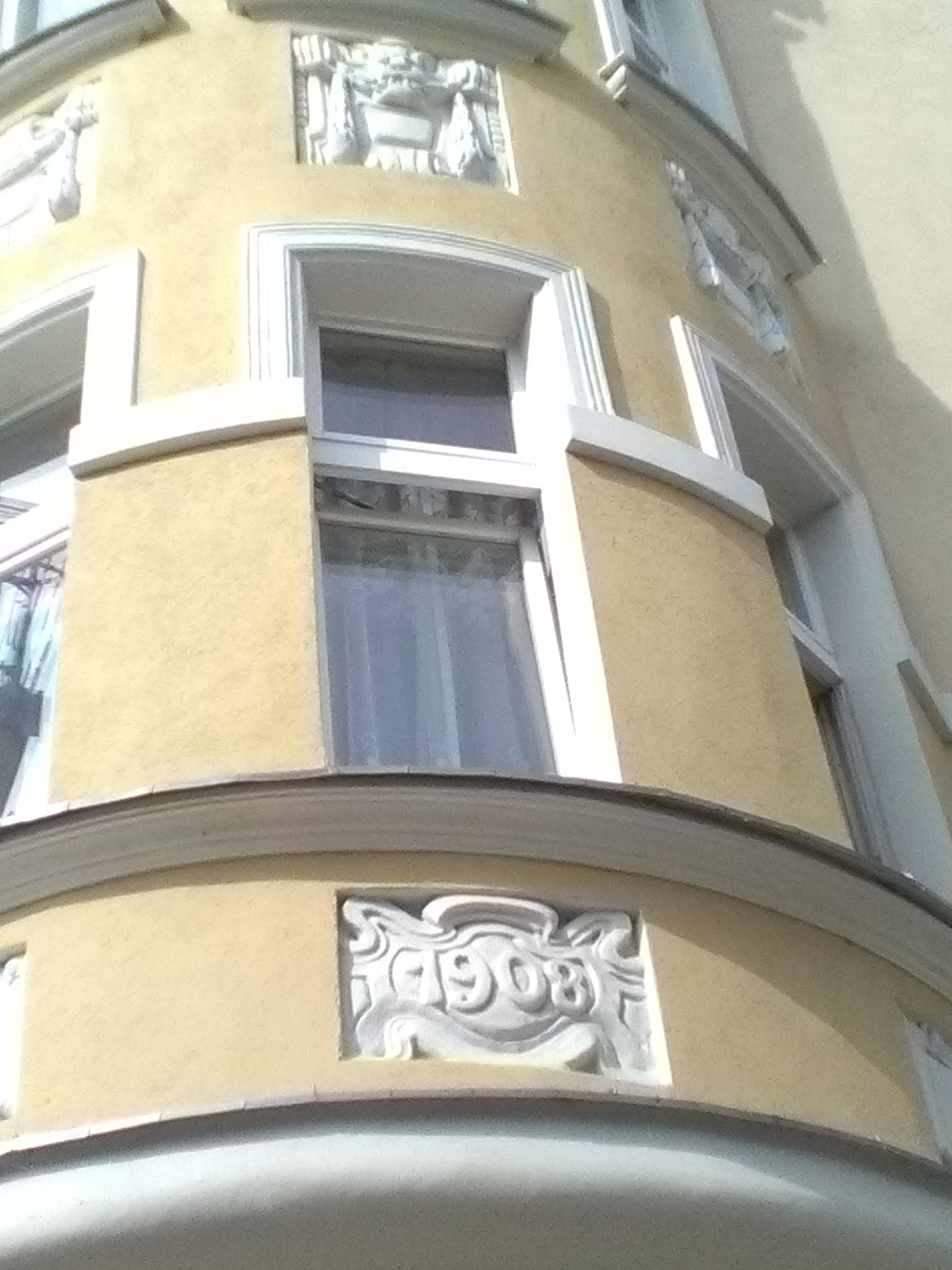
Bay window detail

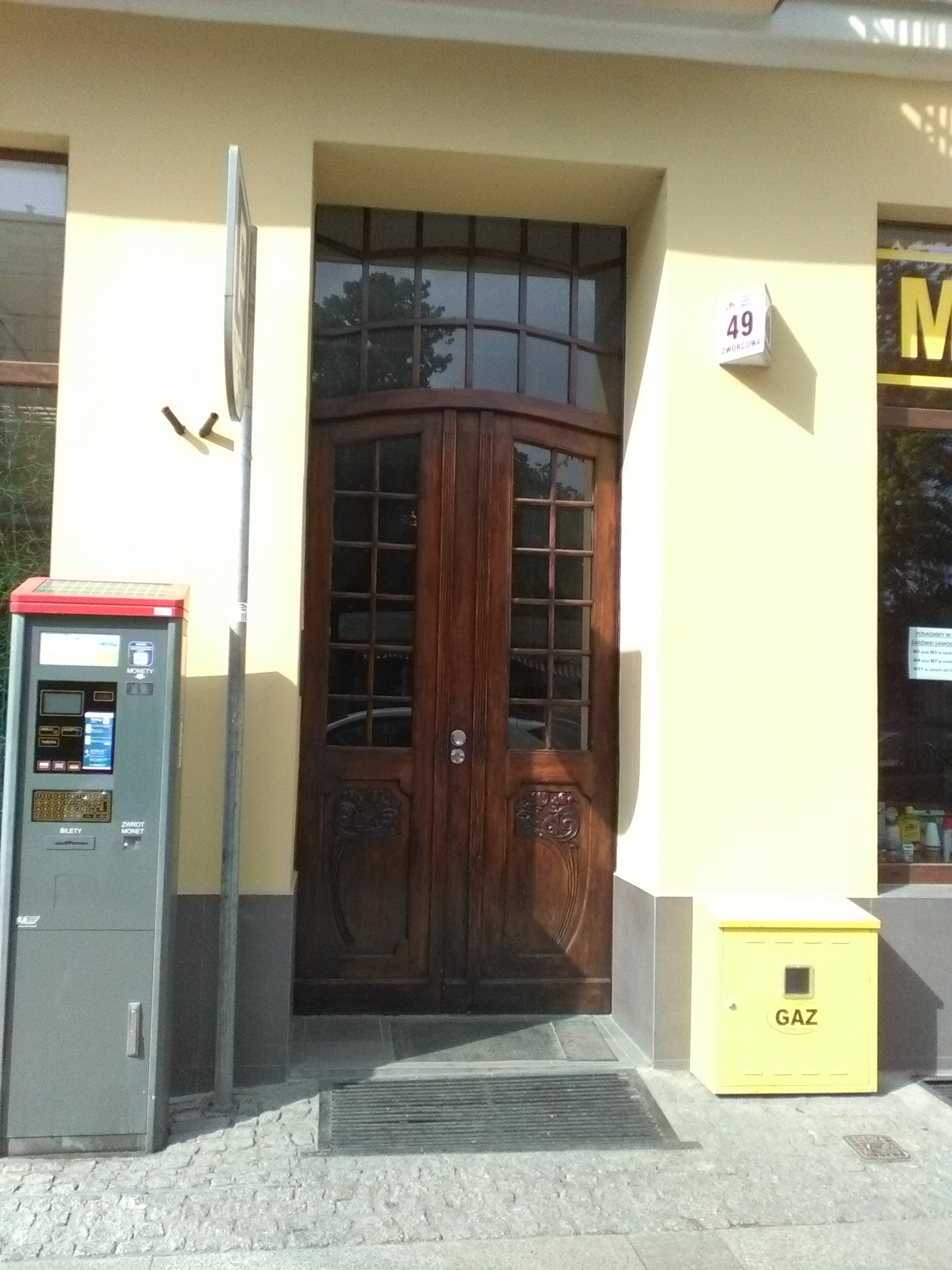
Main entrance door

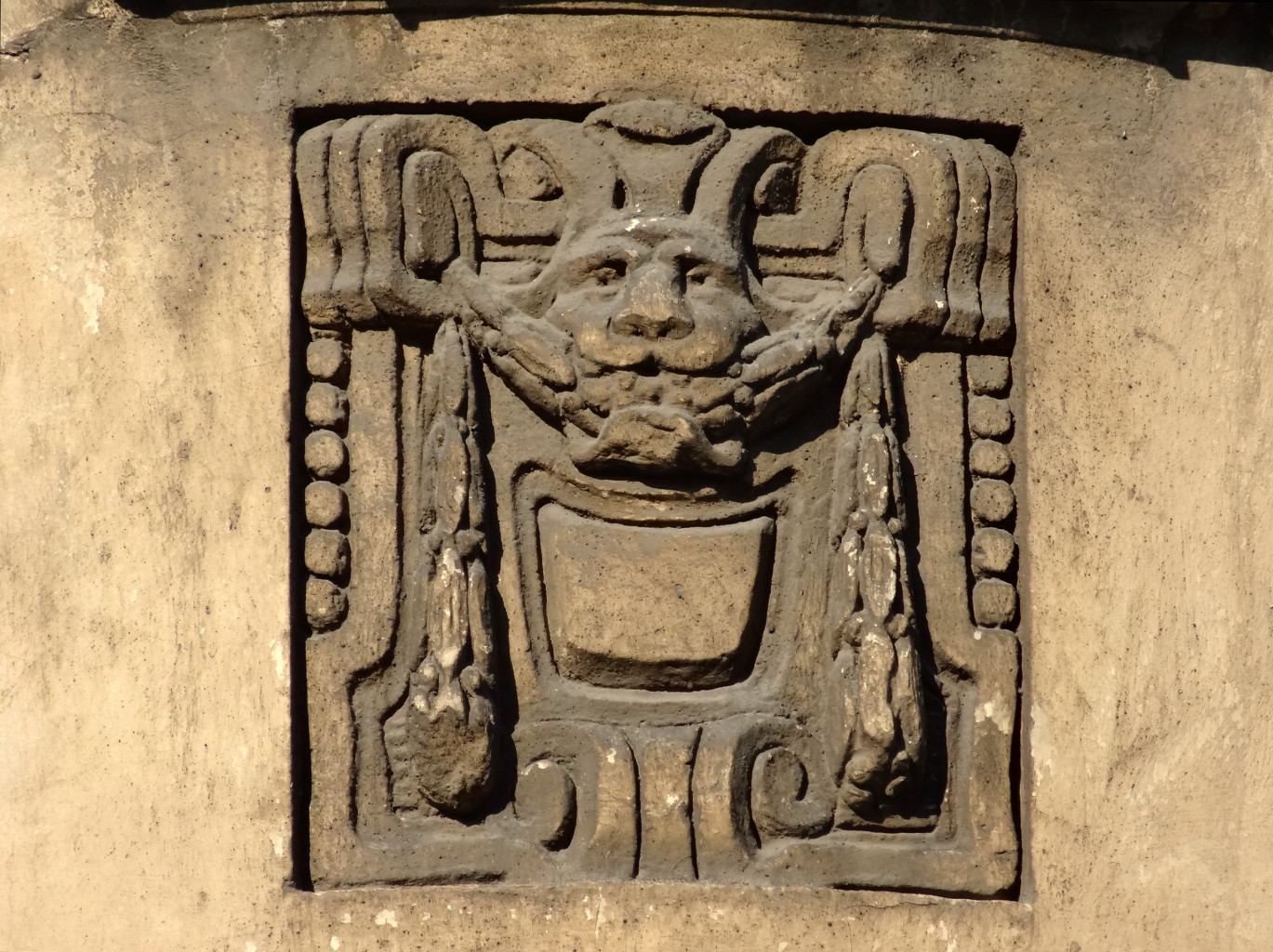
Motif detail

=== Tenement at 50, corner with Sienkiewicza Street ===
1895

Neo-Renaissance

Christian Theodore Hinß has been running there a coach workshop (German: Wagenfabrikant) since 1880. His relative Carl was landlord until 1917.

Facades display a northern Neo-Renaissance style with elaborate ornament and scrollwork (on pediments, cartouches), balustrades, pinnacles, together with stone blocks imitation, bay windows and a mansard roof.

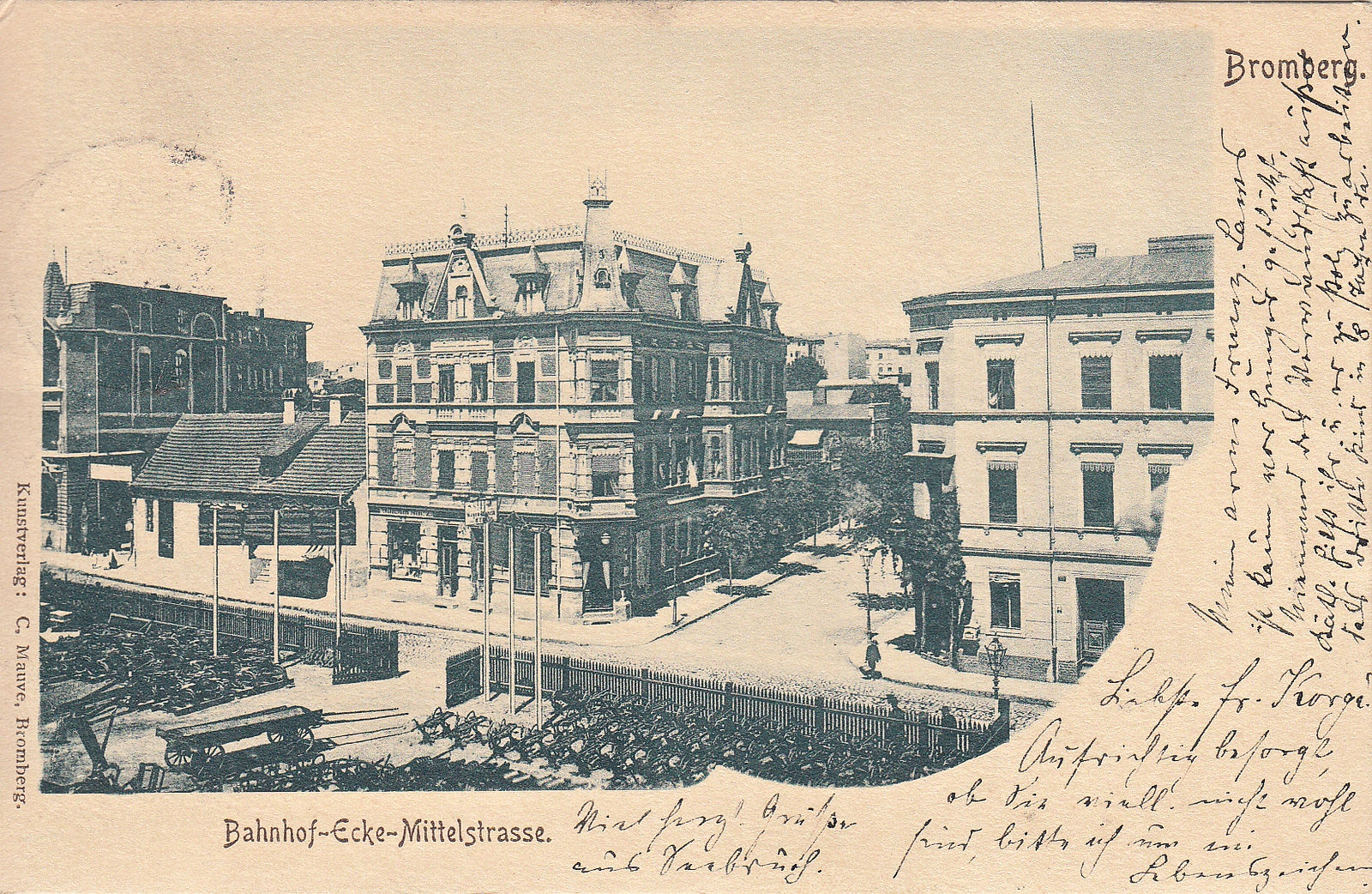
1900 postcard view

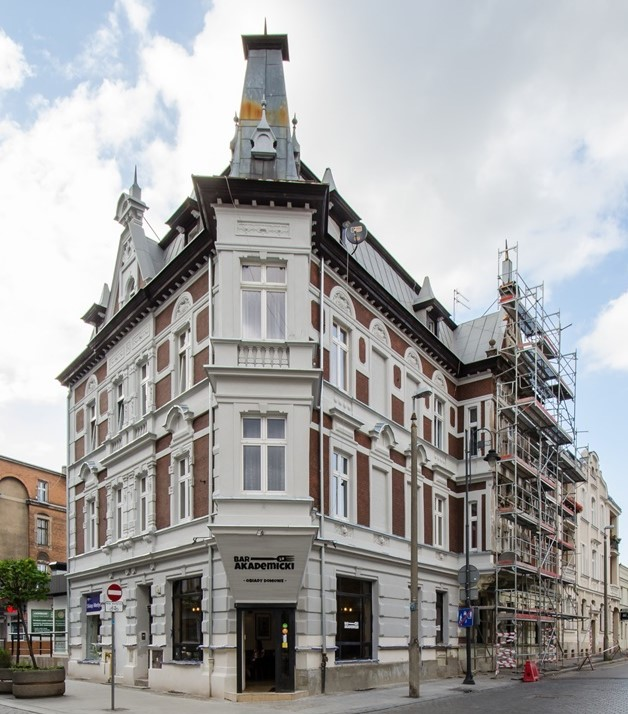
Facades on Dworcowa and Sienkiewicz Streets

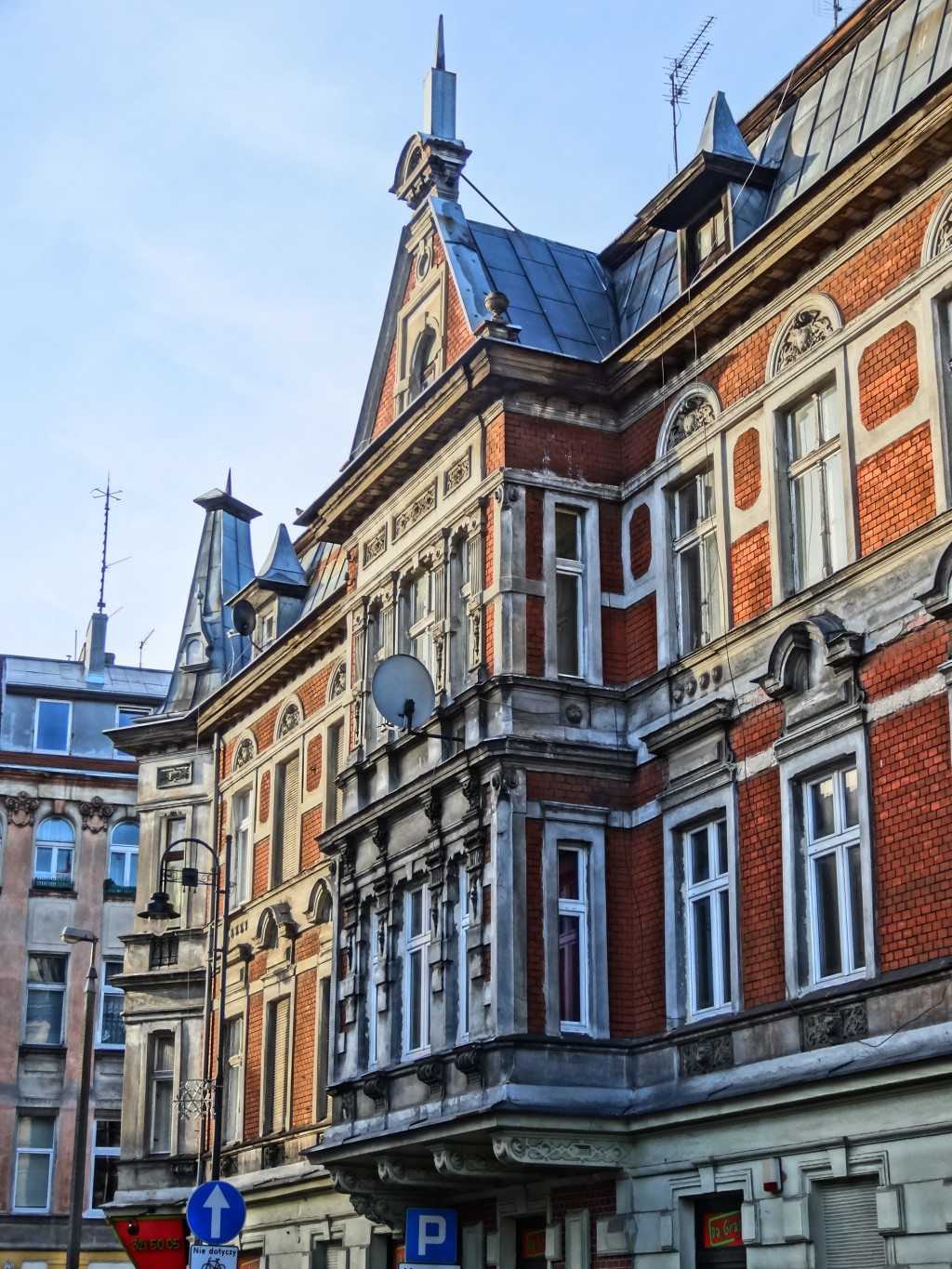
Facade on H. Sienkiewicz Street

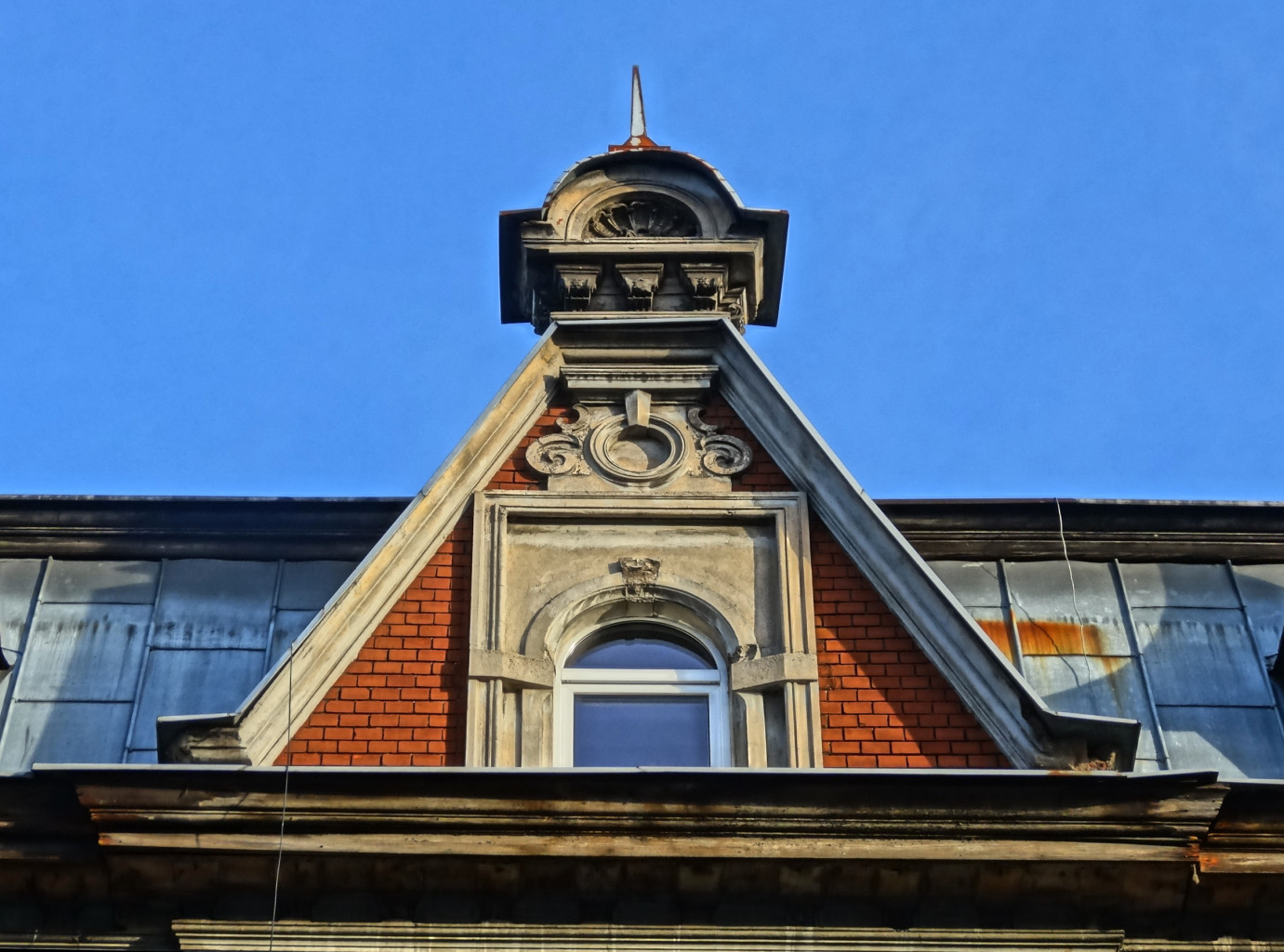
Gable dormer

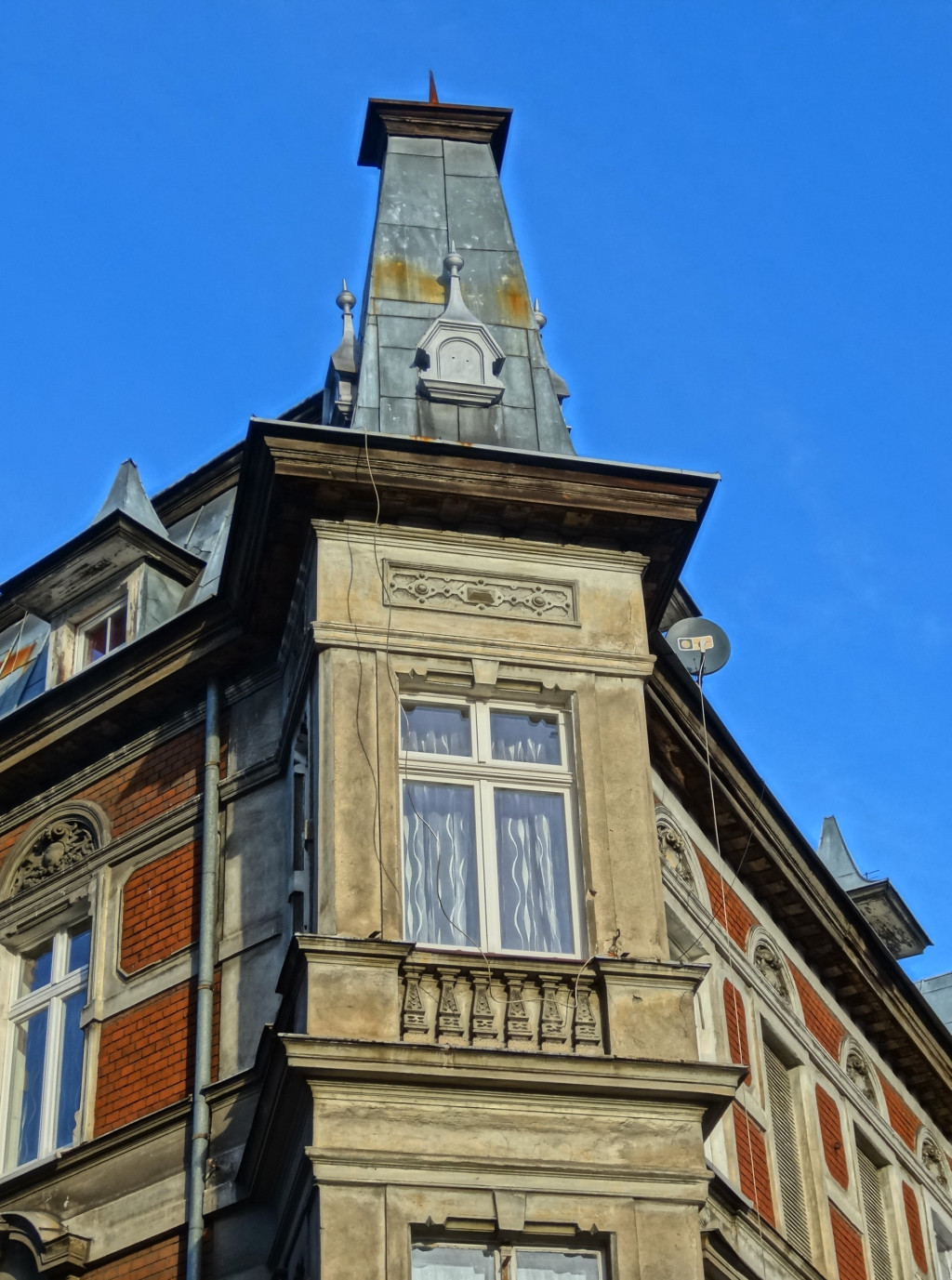
Corner bay window

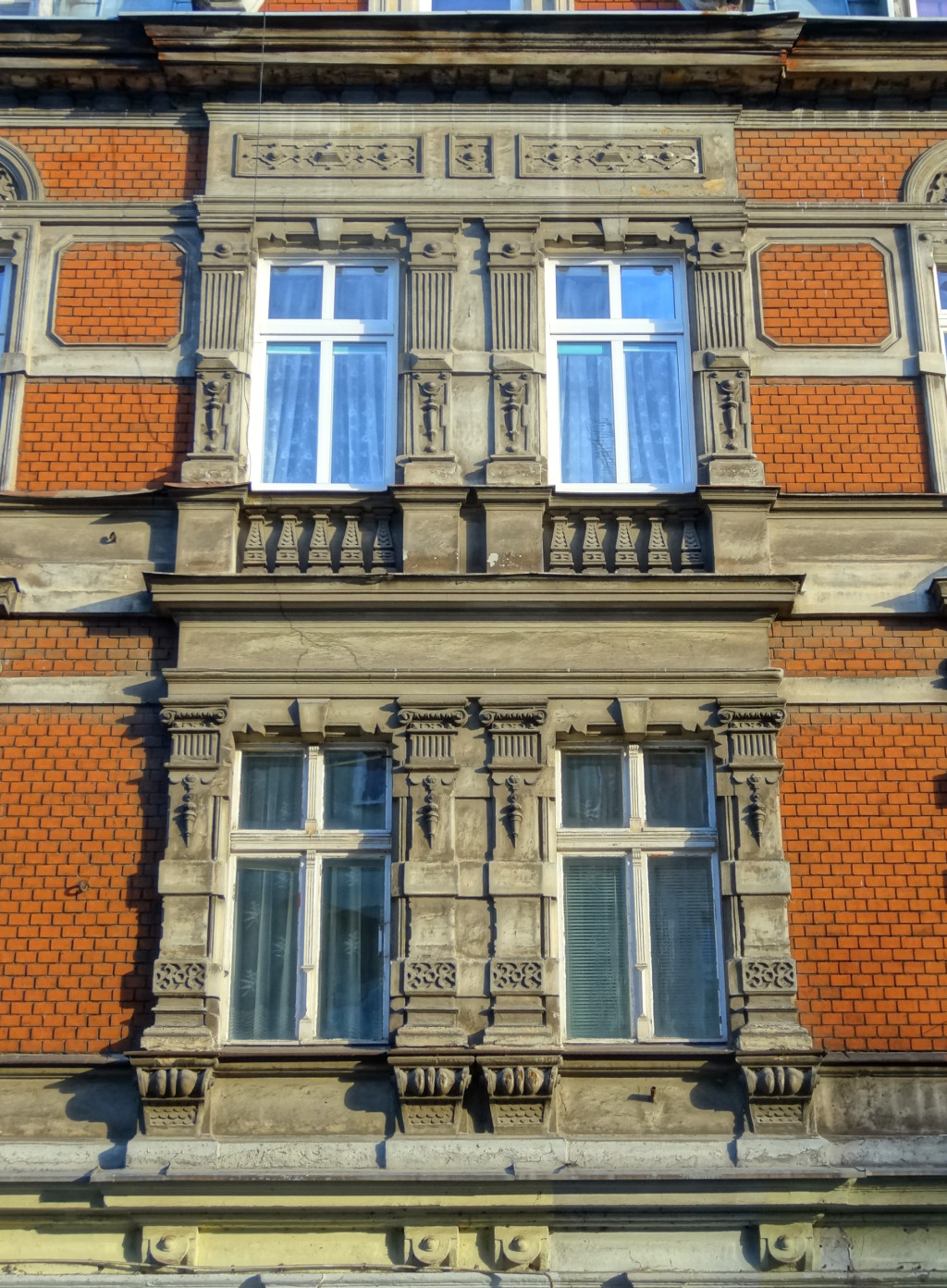
Windows decoration

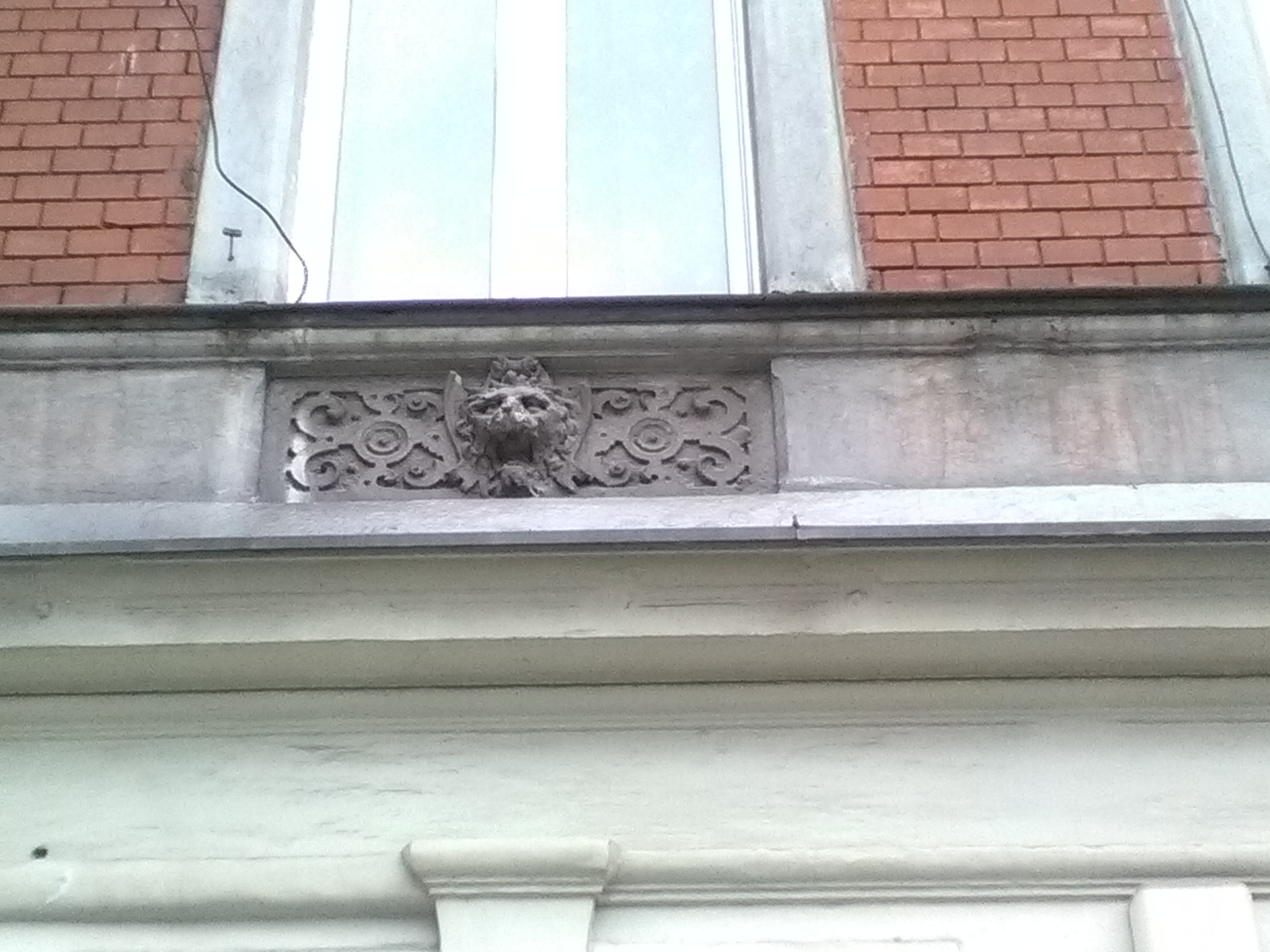
Lion face cartouche

=== Ludwig Schultz Tenement at 54 ===
1893–1894, by Józef Święcicki

North European Mannerism, forms of Neo-Gothic

The house at then Bahnhofstraße 72 was part of an extensive property, between Dworcowa and Lipowa street which belonged to Ludwig Schultz, co-founder of shipping company Schultz und Winnemer. The firm survived until World War I. During the interwar, the building housed a shelter for poors, run by Hermann Dietz.

It is an exceptional house with a very narrow body, a side wing with entrance on it. Most interesting are the arrangement of loggias, pinnacles, narrow and tall windows with small gargoyles to drain the water.

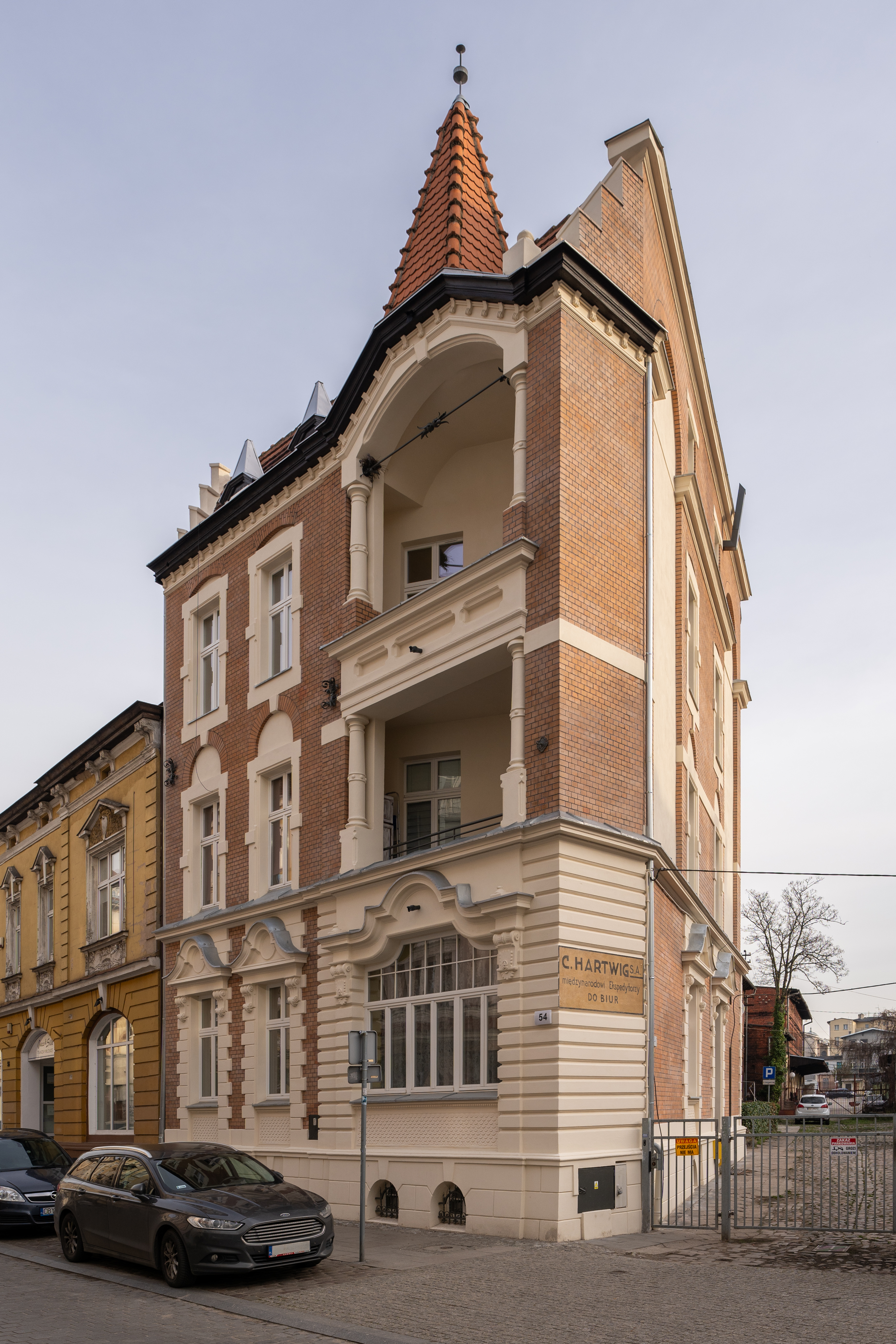
Facade on Dworcowa Street

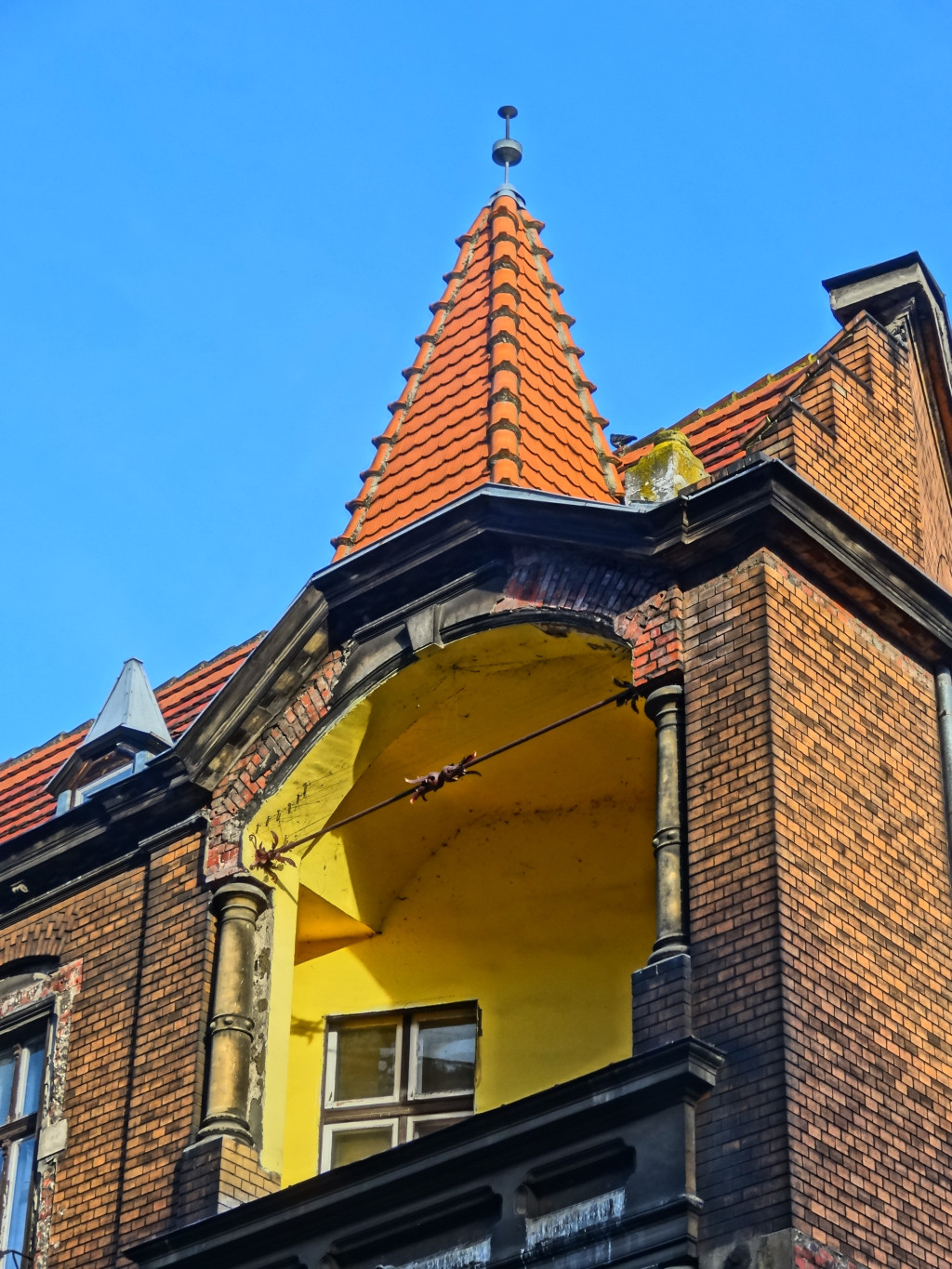
Pinnacle detail

=== Tenement at 55/57 ===
1902-1903

German Historicism

Plots situated between Bahnhofstraße 22 and Bahnhofstraße 28 (from today 's Dworcowa Nr.51 to 61) were property of the Prussian Railway Direction (German: Preußische Ostbahn) which had tenements erected to house officials, personnel and administration. The building at Nr.55/57 was one of them, realized in the beginning of the 20th century.

The massive building shows balanced facade with two grand bay windows, several balconies and a large terrace running between the gable, beneath dormers. Worth underlining are the two gates adorned with a typical Art Nouveau female figure (Nr.55) and with vegetal curly scrollwork (Nr.57).

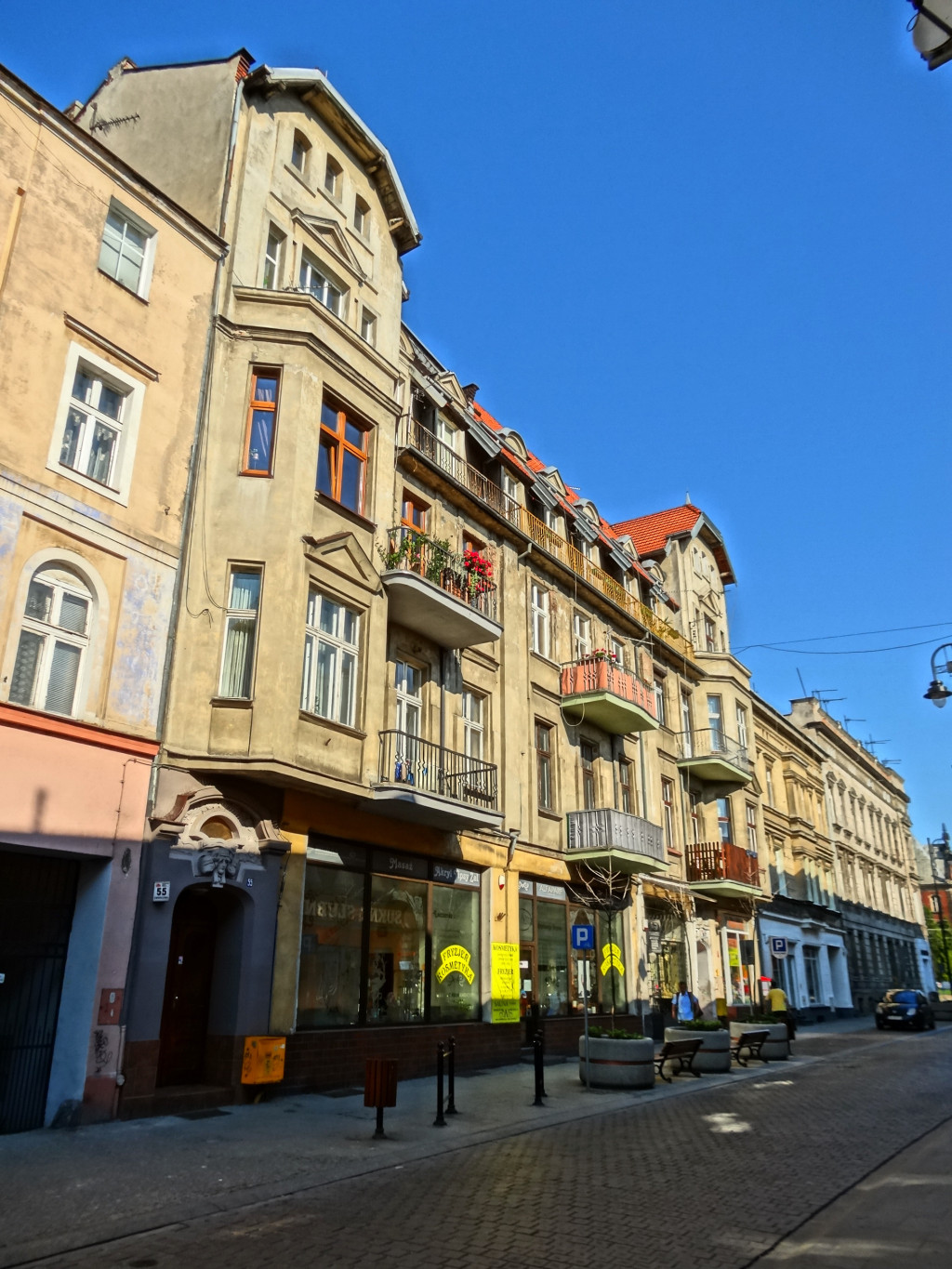
View of Nr.55 (front) and 57 (back)

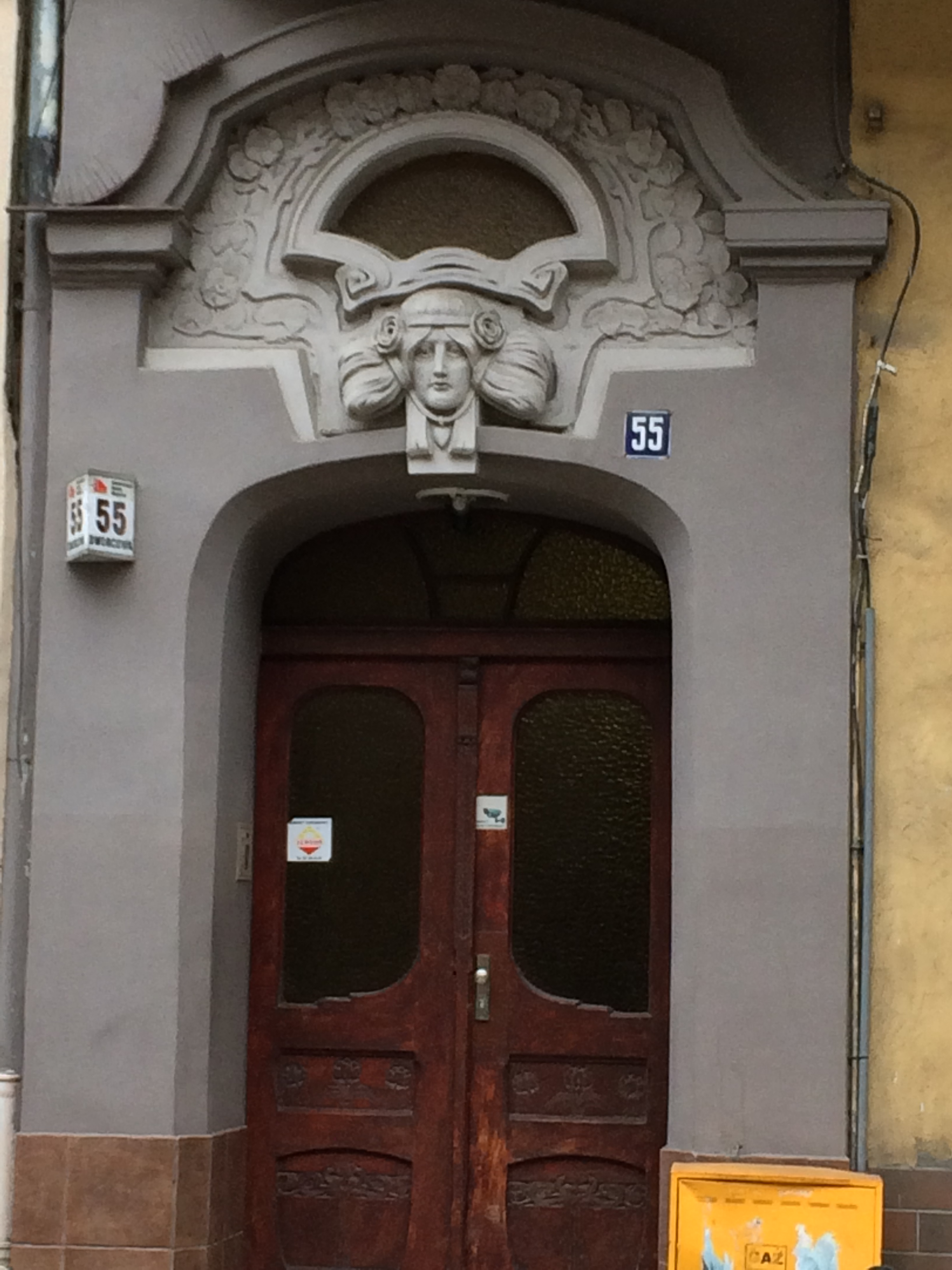
Portal Art nouveau 55

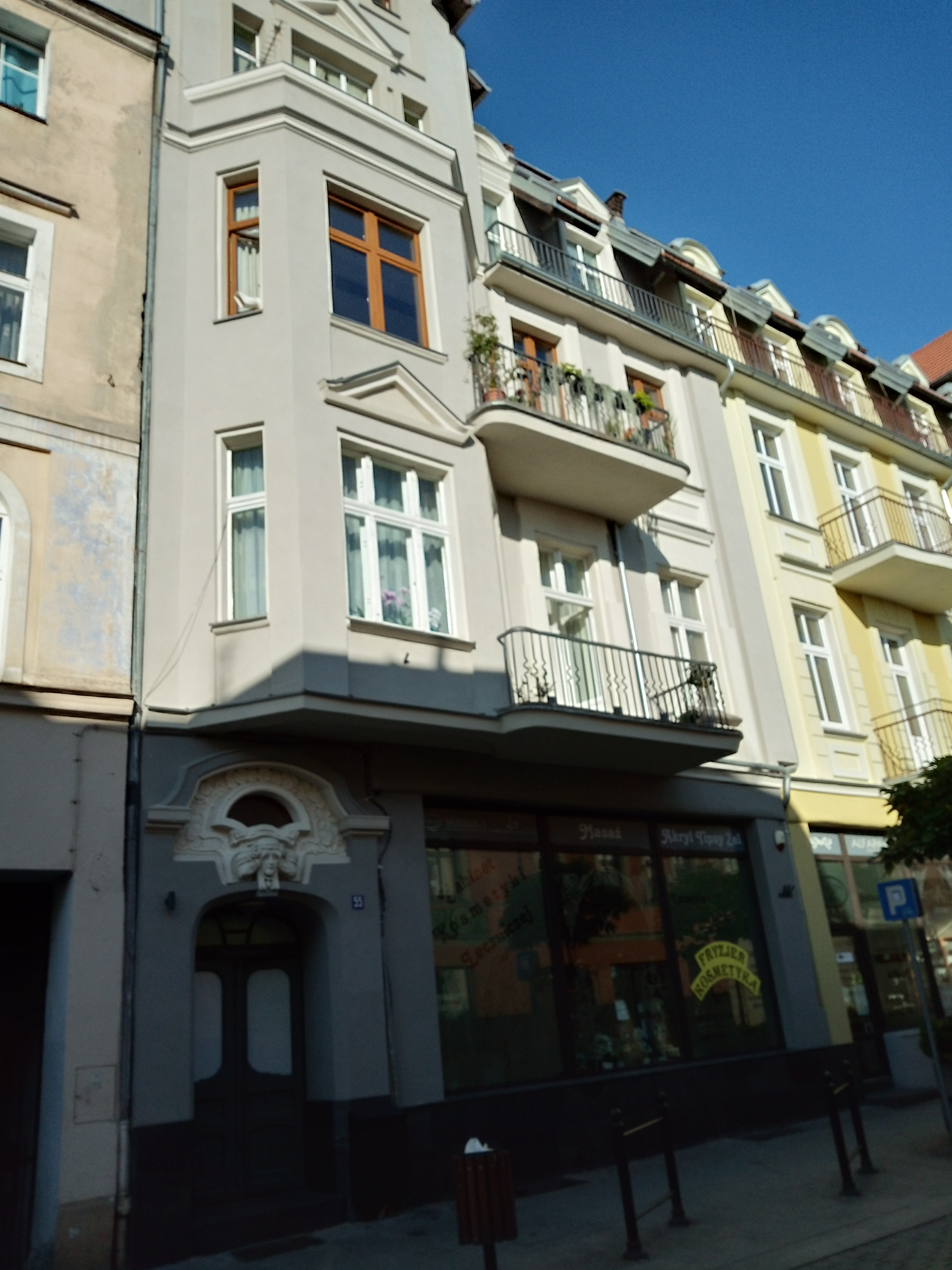
Facade at 55

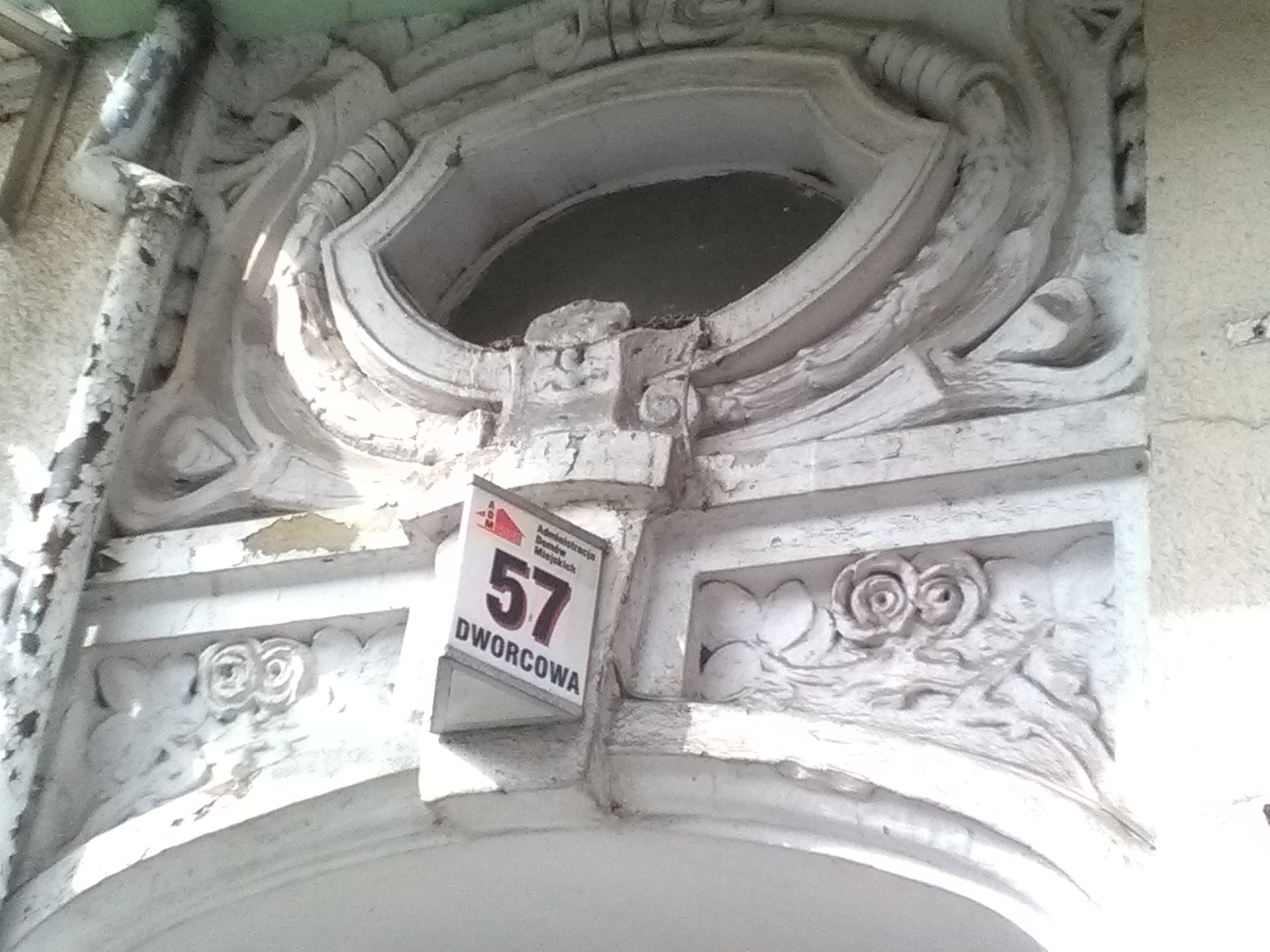
Transom light at 57

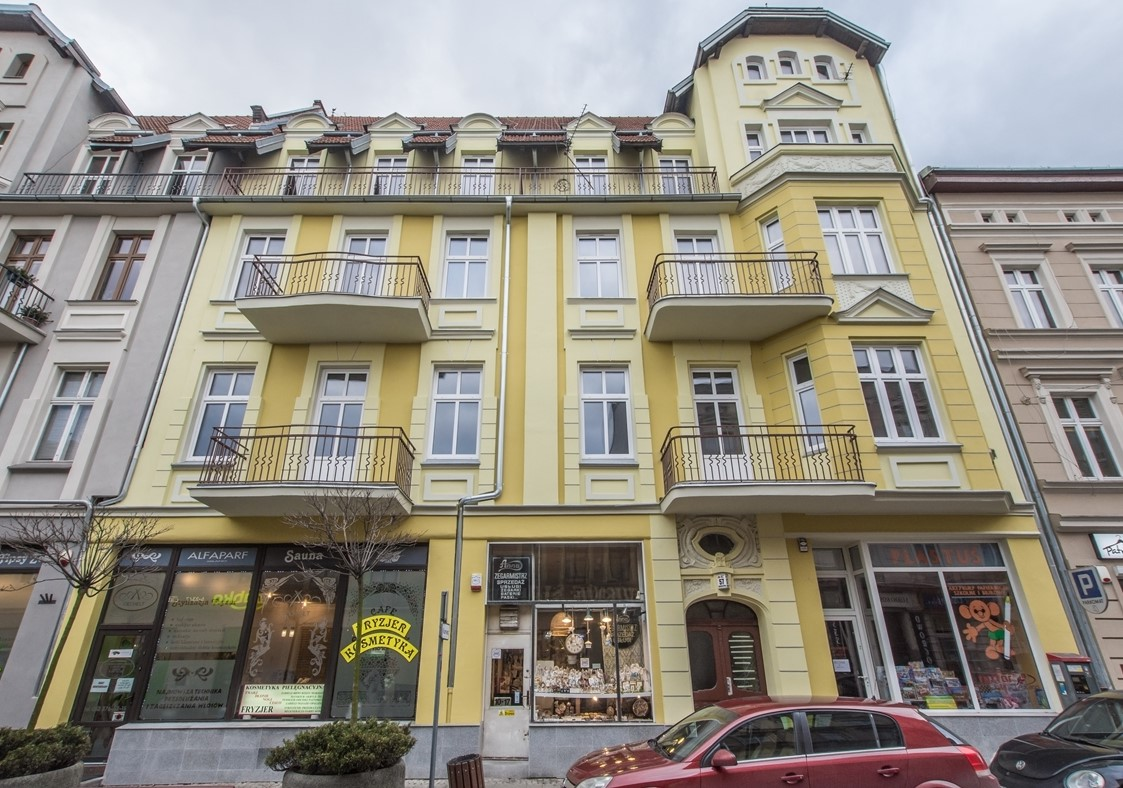
Main elevation at 57

=== Theodore Flöther Tenement at 56 ===
1903-1904

Eclecticism

At its inception, landlord of actual tenement (then at Bahnhofstraße 71) was Theodore Flöther, who was the founder of a firm producing agricultural machines in Jasień, Lubusz Voivodeship. Both the actual building and the neighbouring one (Nr.58, non existent today) have been used to showcase the production of the factory until end of World War I. In the 1930s, the building housed a coffee shop roasting and grinding coffee, run by W.J. Luczkowski

The ground floor of the edifice still got the large curved glass openings designed for exhibiting machines. First floor windows are framed with delicate ornamentation and scrollwork, especially the larger one on the right, with its early Art Nouveau tympanon motifs inside the triangular pediment.

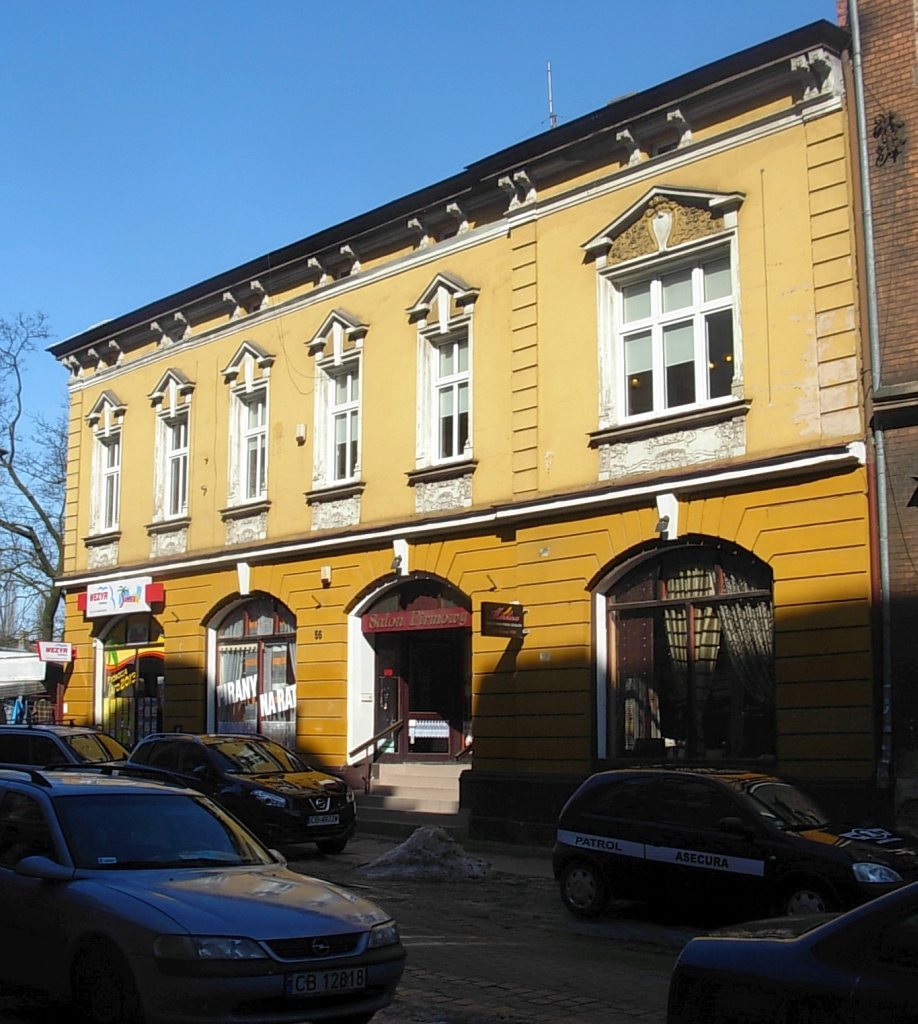
Facade on Dworcowa Street

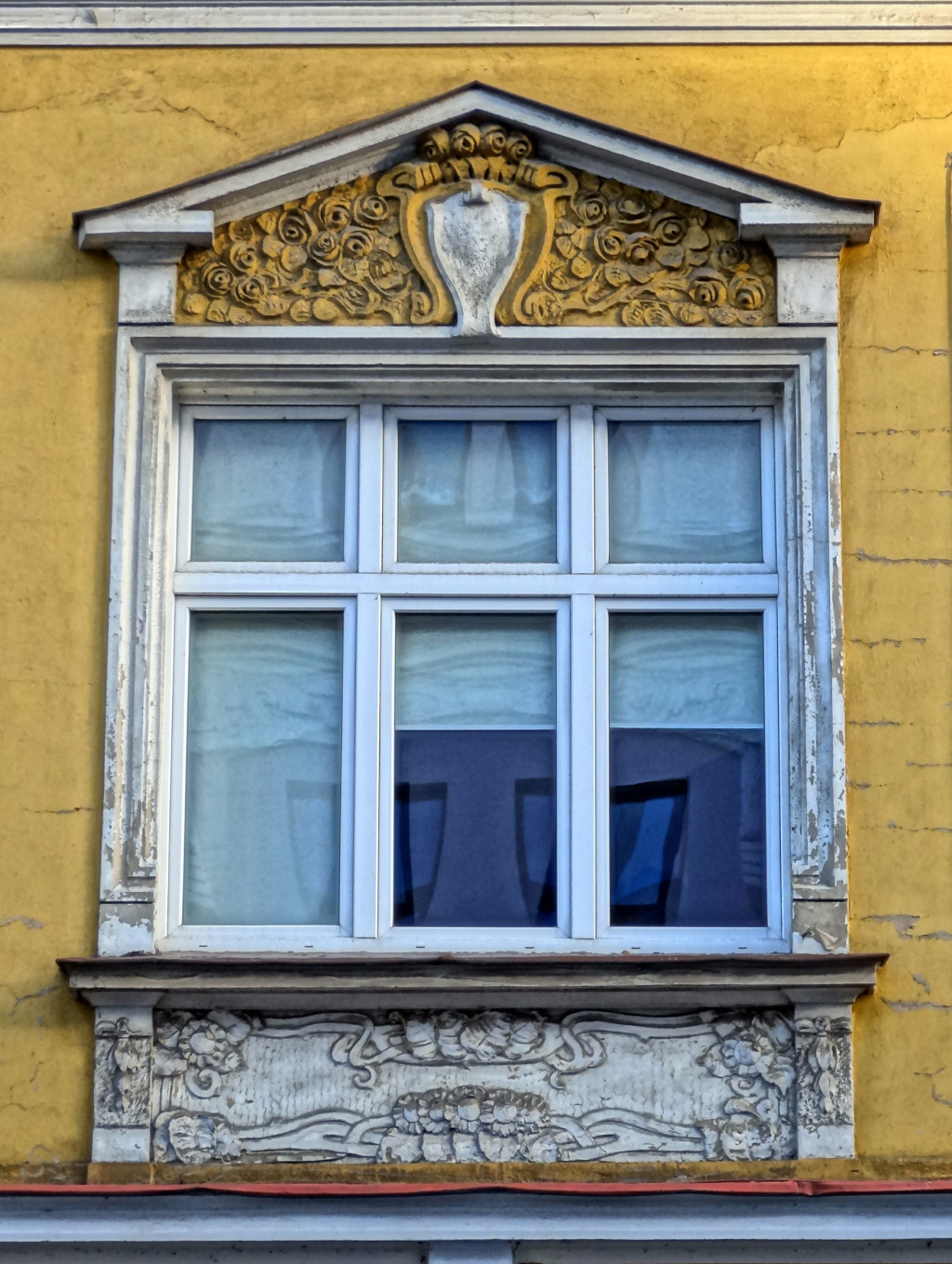
Window detail

=== Tenement at 61 ===
1873–1874, by Gustaw Weihe

Neo-Renaissance

Gustaw Weihe, the architect selected for this building, will later be the main designer of Hotel Ratuszowy in Długa street in 1881. The house was first possessed by the Wulf brothers (Adolf & Theodor), factory managers: the also had the adjoining house where the tramway line runs today to the bridge over the Brda. Later, in the 1880s, all plots situated between Bahnhofstraße 22 and Bahnhofstraße 28 (from today 's Dworcowa Nr.51 to 63) were bought by the Prussian Railway Direction (German: Preußische Ostbahn) to house officials, personnel and administration.

The main elevation is influenced by Italian Cinquecento, with its pilastered windows and the triangular pediments. Refurbished in 2018, one can now make out fine details, such as scrollworks, a row of lion's heads crowning the elevation and a nice stretch of rosettes spanning like a frieze.

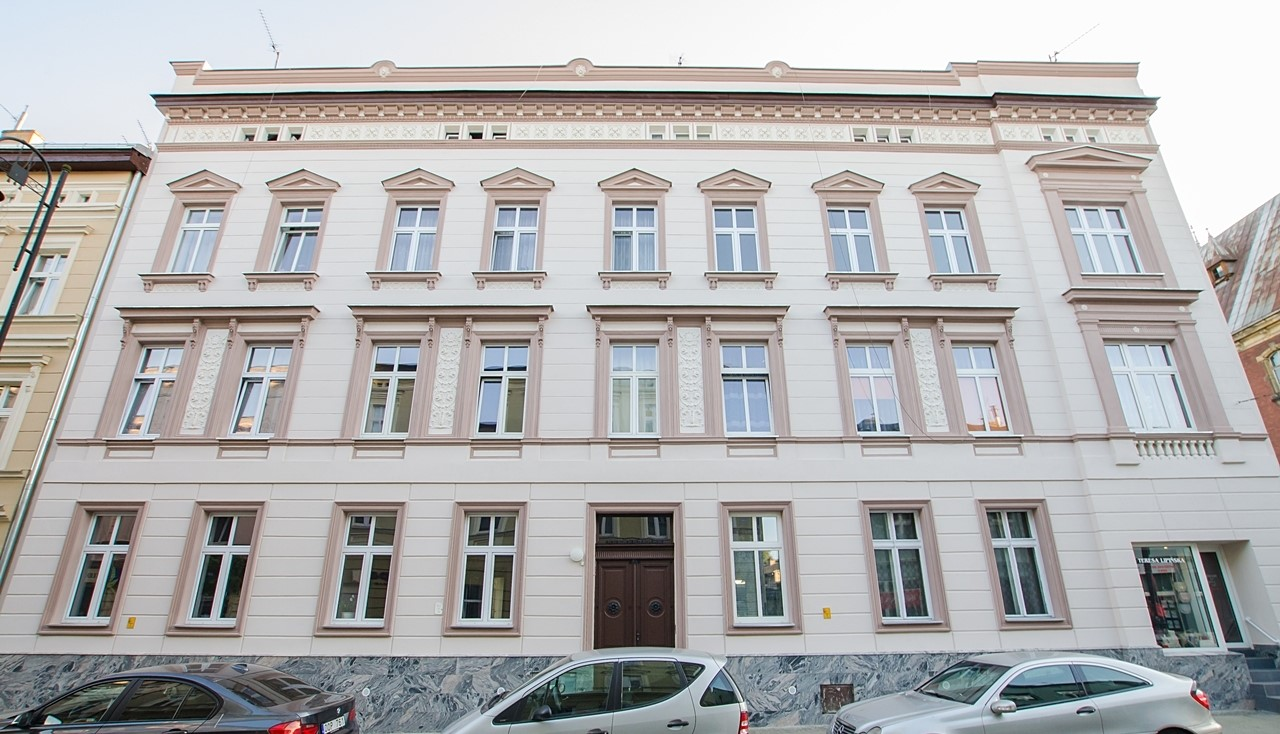
Main elevation on Dworcowa Street

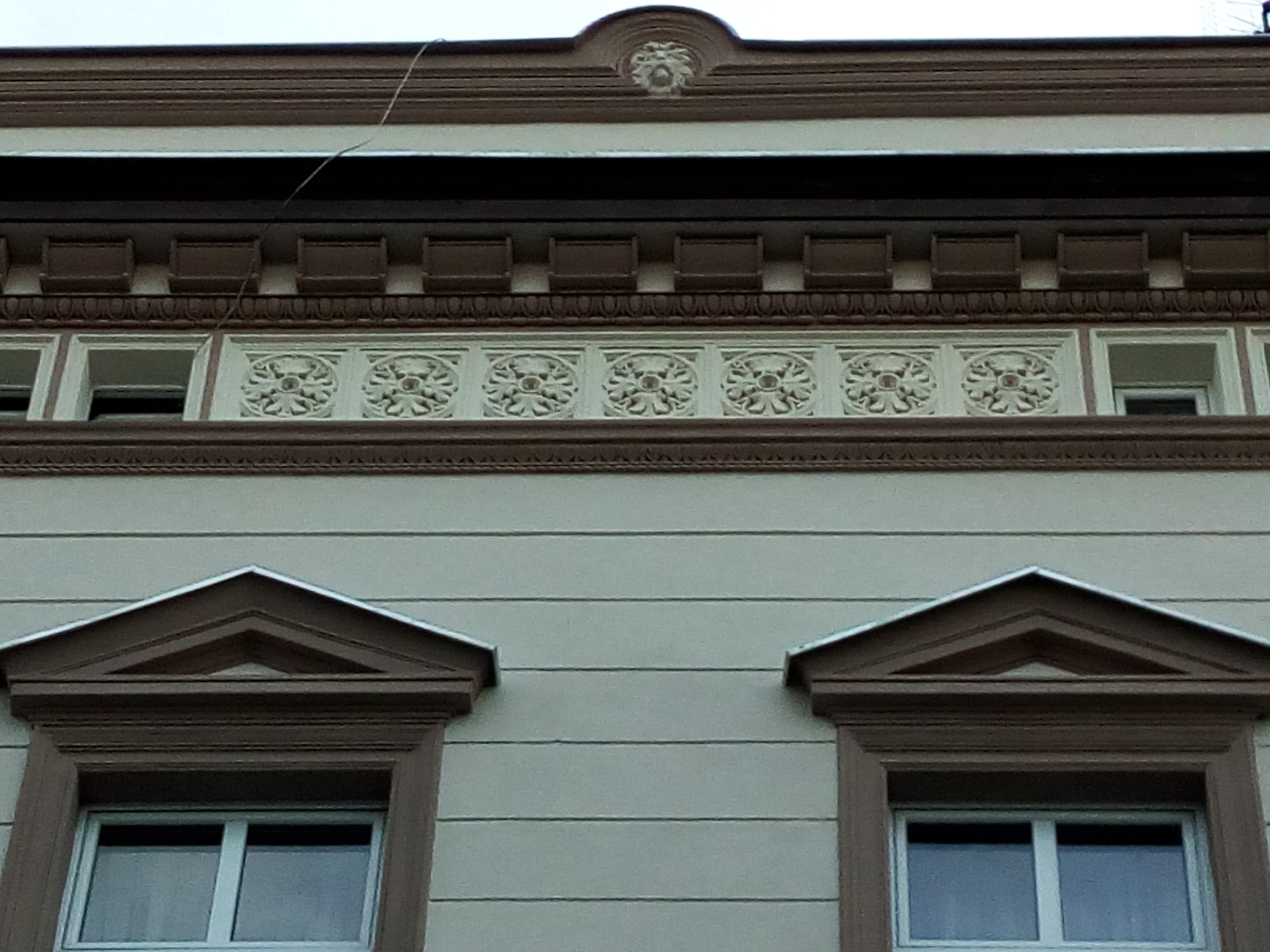
Detail of the upper floors, with lion's head and rosettes

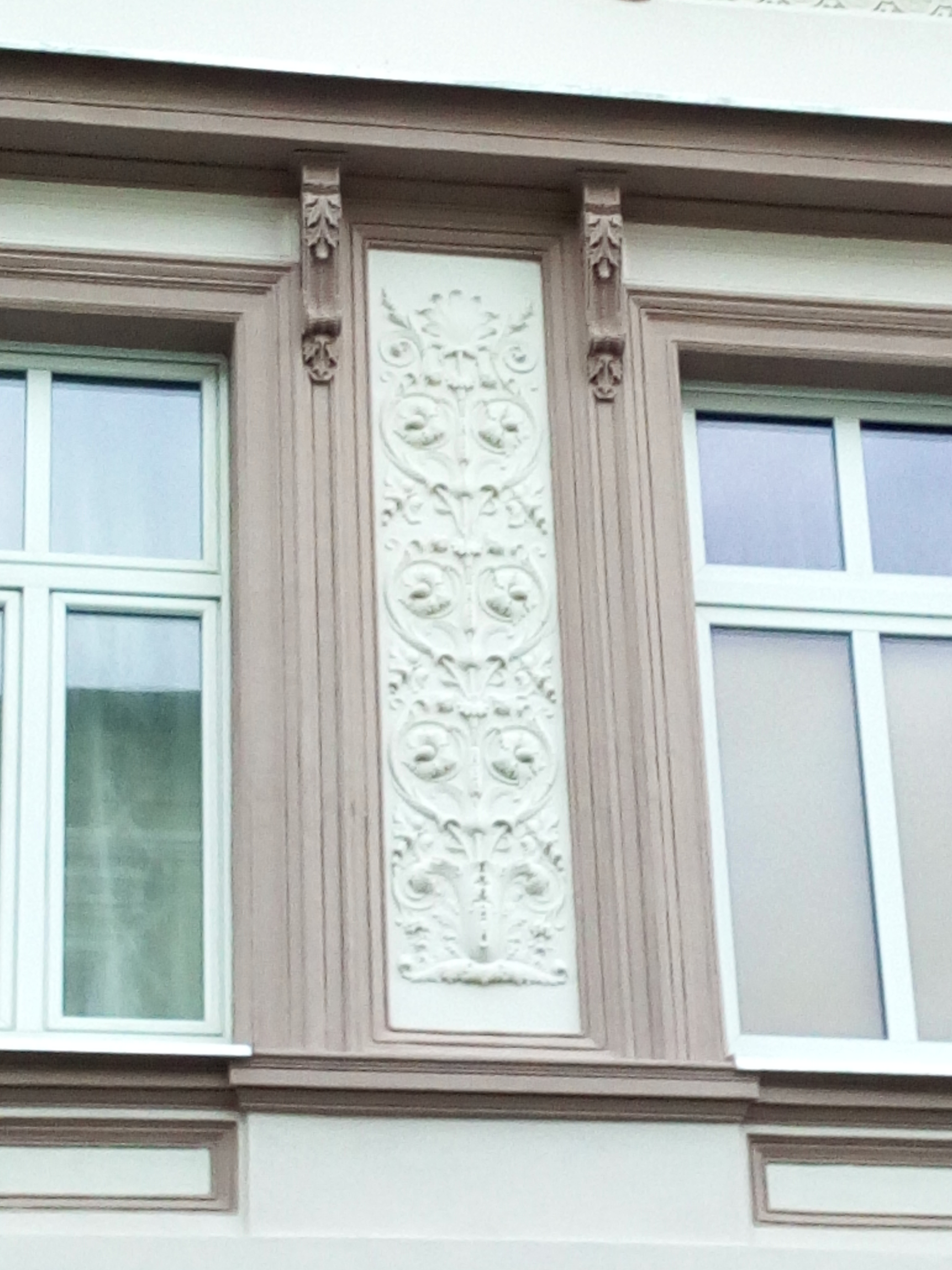
Scrollworks detail

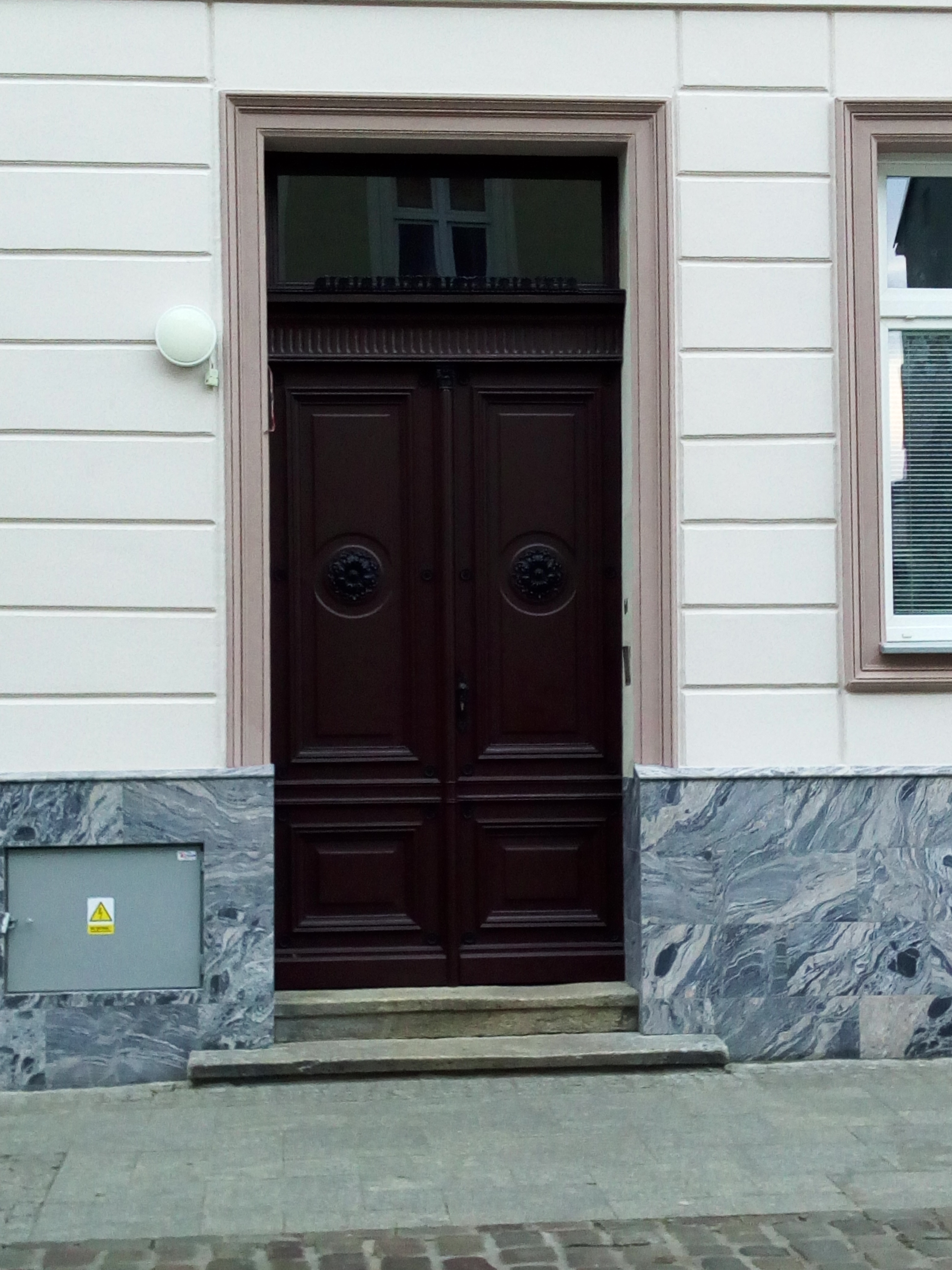
Entrance door

=== Tenement at 62 ===
1860s

Neoclassical architecture

The tenement, then at Bahnhofstraße 68, had for first landlord Julius Bebersdorf, living at the abutting house (today's 64).

Restored in 2019, the facade displays a symmetric facade with a neo-classic style.

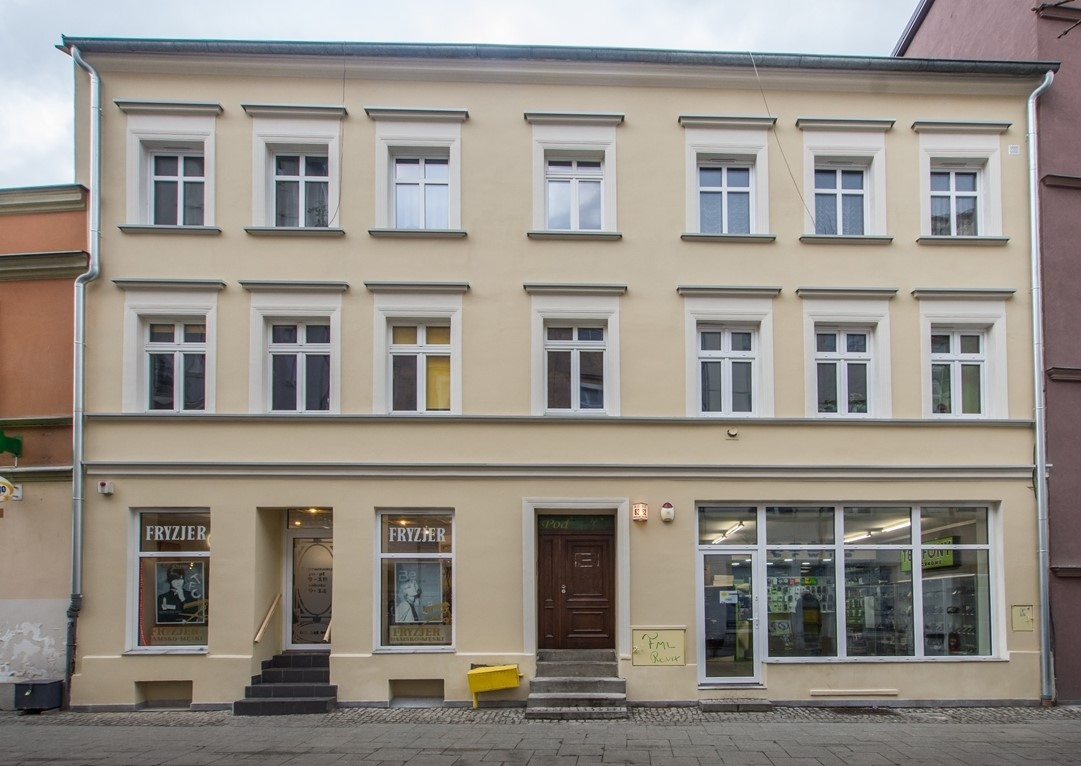
Renovated facade on the street

=== Prussian Eastern Railway Headquarters, at 63 ===
Registered on Kuyavian-Pomeranian Voivodeship heritage list, Nr.601288-Reg.A/748, December 10, 1971

1886–1889, by Martin Gropius, Heino Schmieden

Dutch Mannerism

Seat of Prussian Eastern Railway (1889–1895), then regional directorate (1895–1920), Pomeranian rail agency and the Central Bureau of Foreign Settlements (1922–1939), and seat of French-Polish Rail Association (1937–1939).

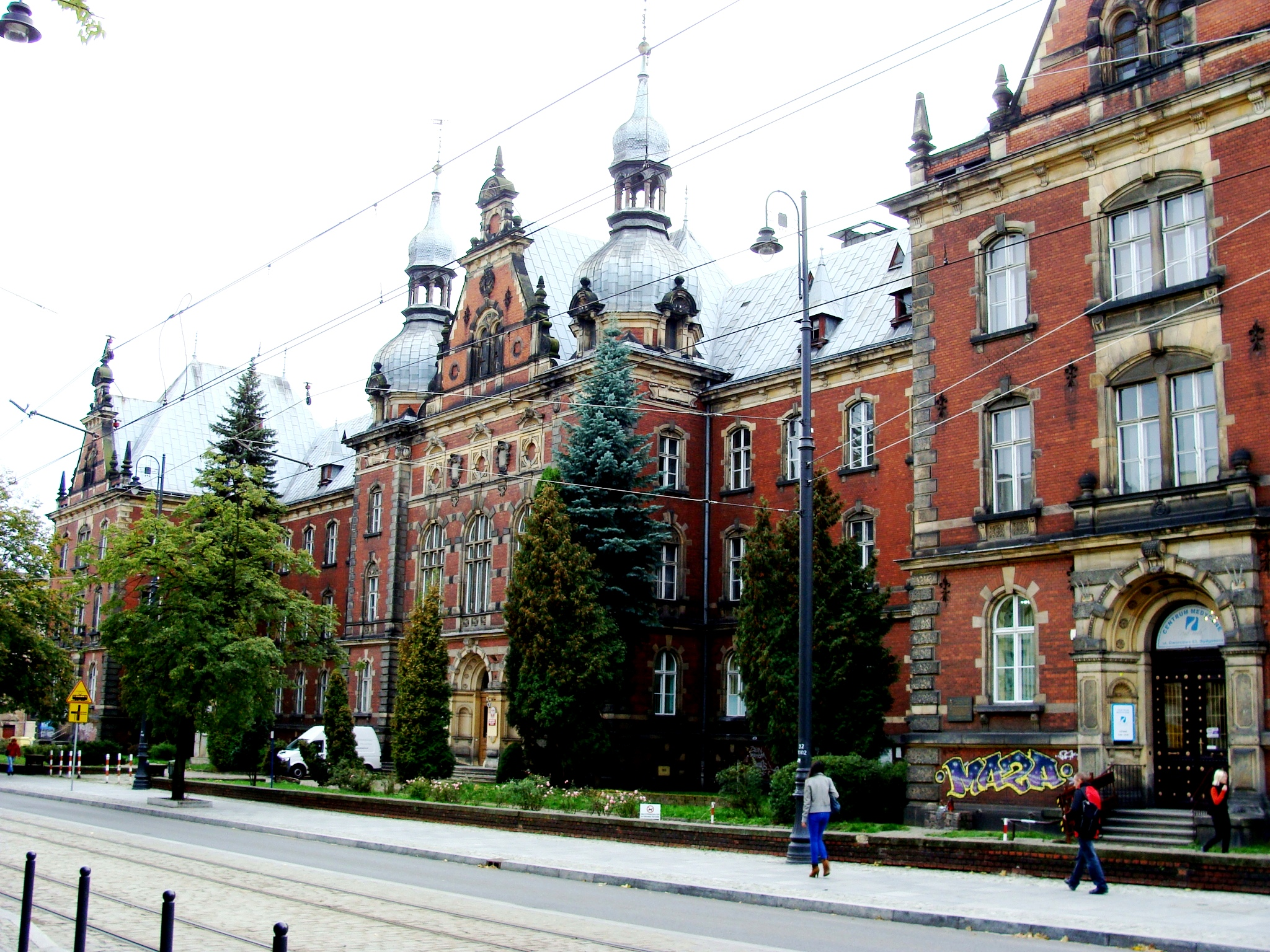
View from Dworcowa street

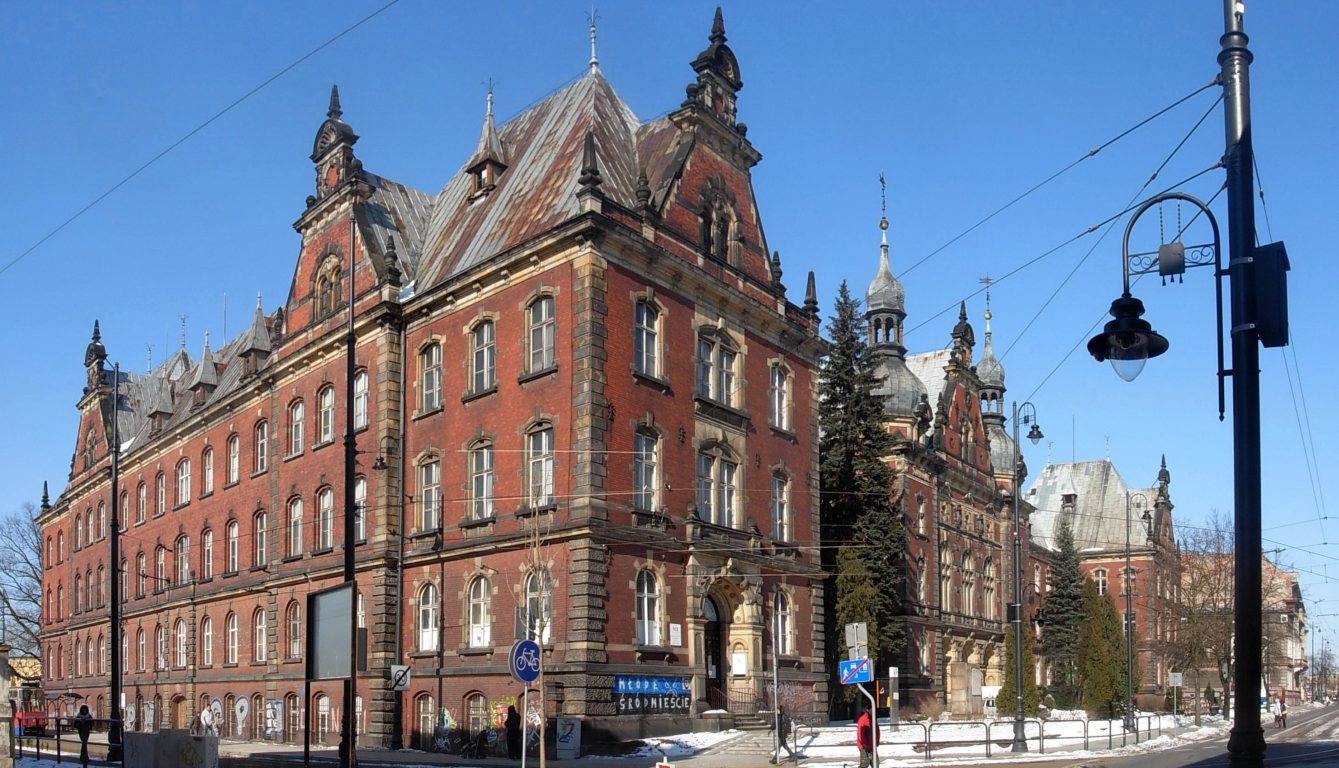
Former Prussian Railways Company building

=== State Archives building at 65 ===
1871

Eclecticism

The first owners of the building at Bahnhofstraße 29 were the Wulf brothers (Adolf & Theodor). They set up in 1865 a shipyard and a steel structure factory; this building housed their offices and their residential house. After the liquidation of their company in 1876, the building has housed in 1886 the General Commission (German: general kommissionsgebäude) conducting land reform in East and West Prussia as well as in the Grand Duchy of Poznań. Since 1906 it operates as an archive building. At the back of the plot, one can still spot the old brick factory buildings from the Wulf brothers' period.

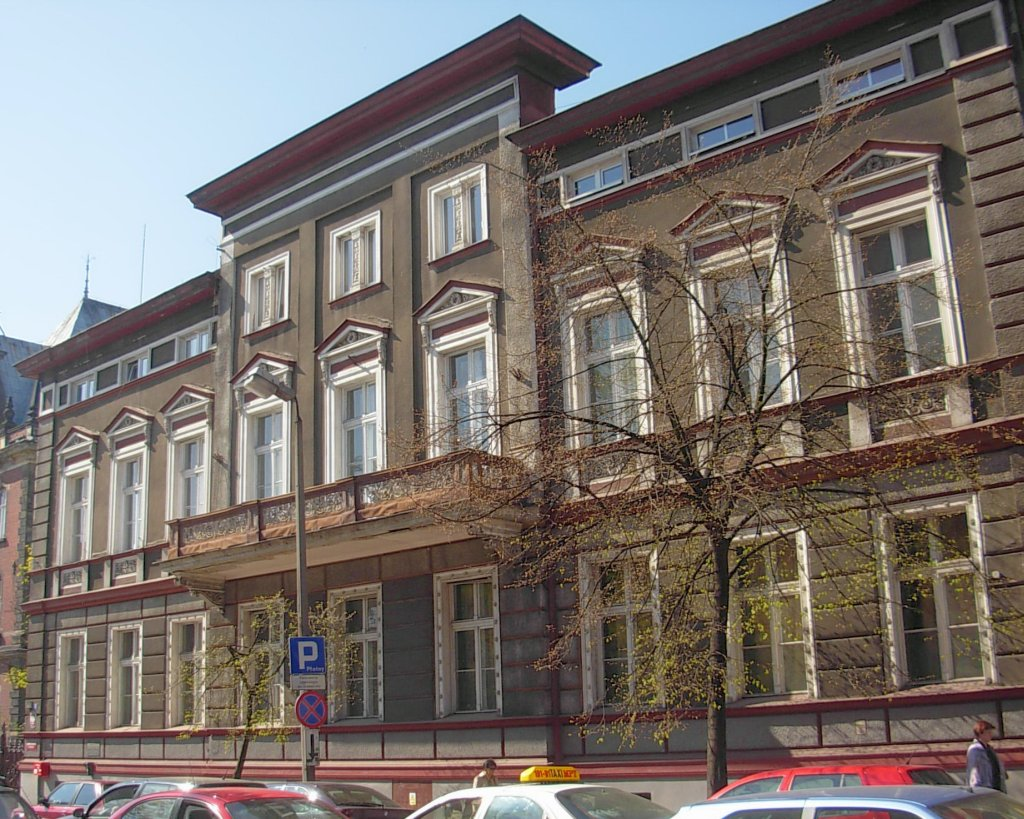
View from Dworcowa street

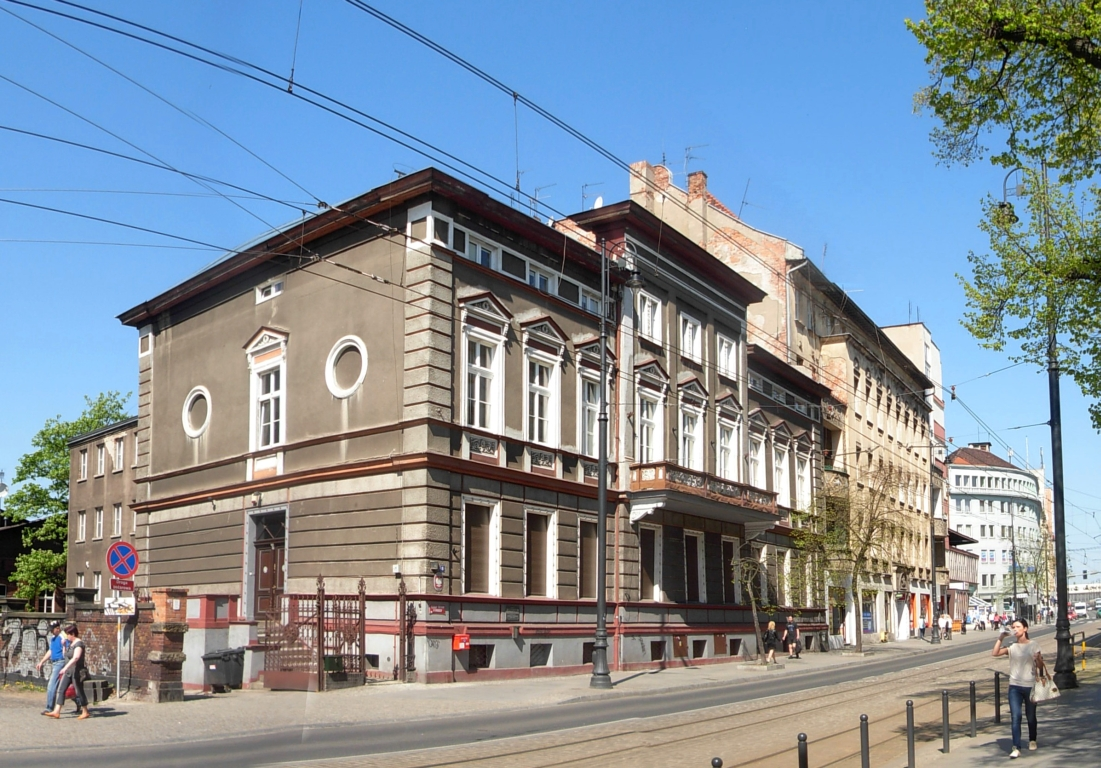
Side view

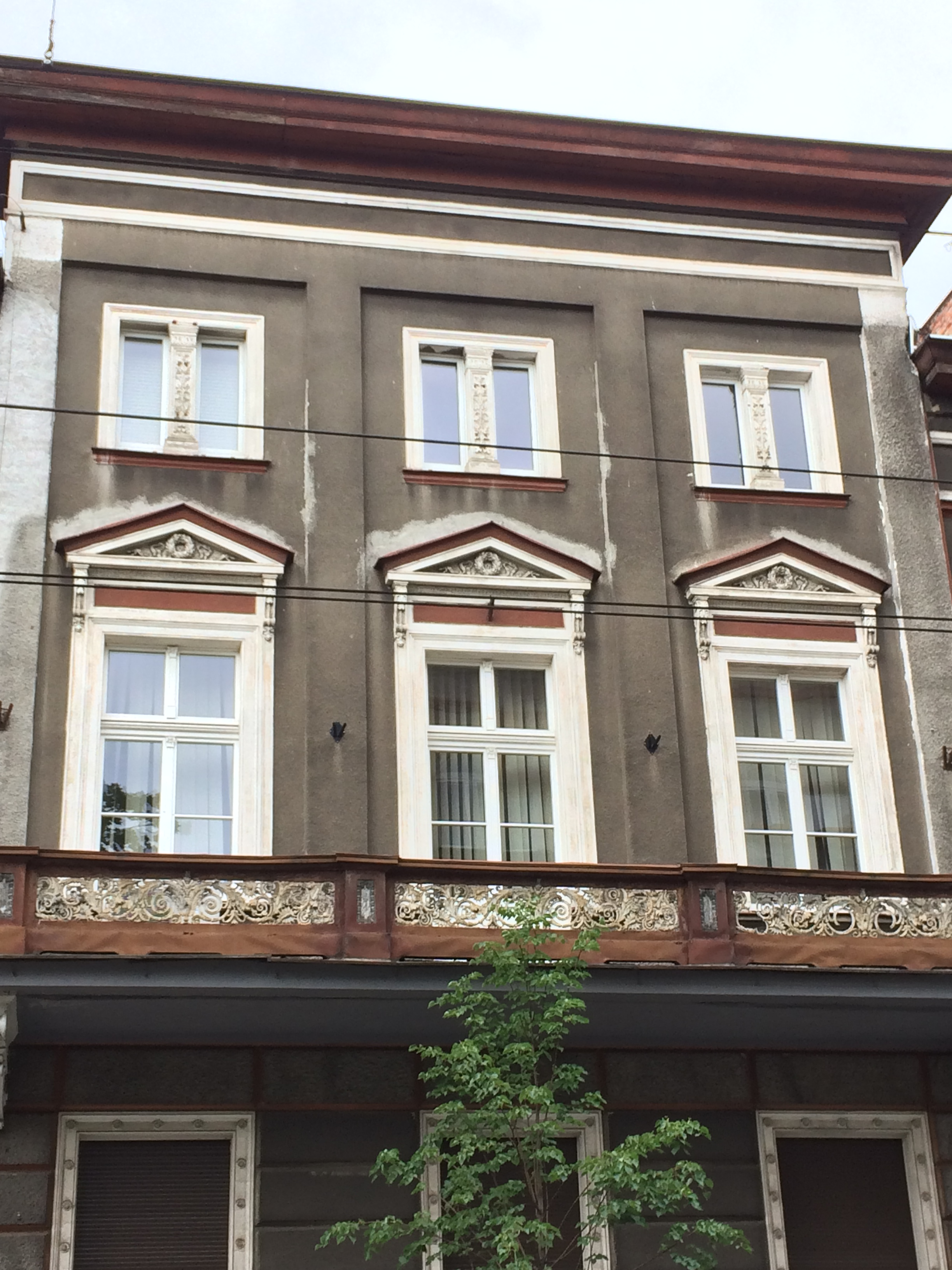
Balcony details

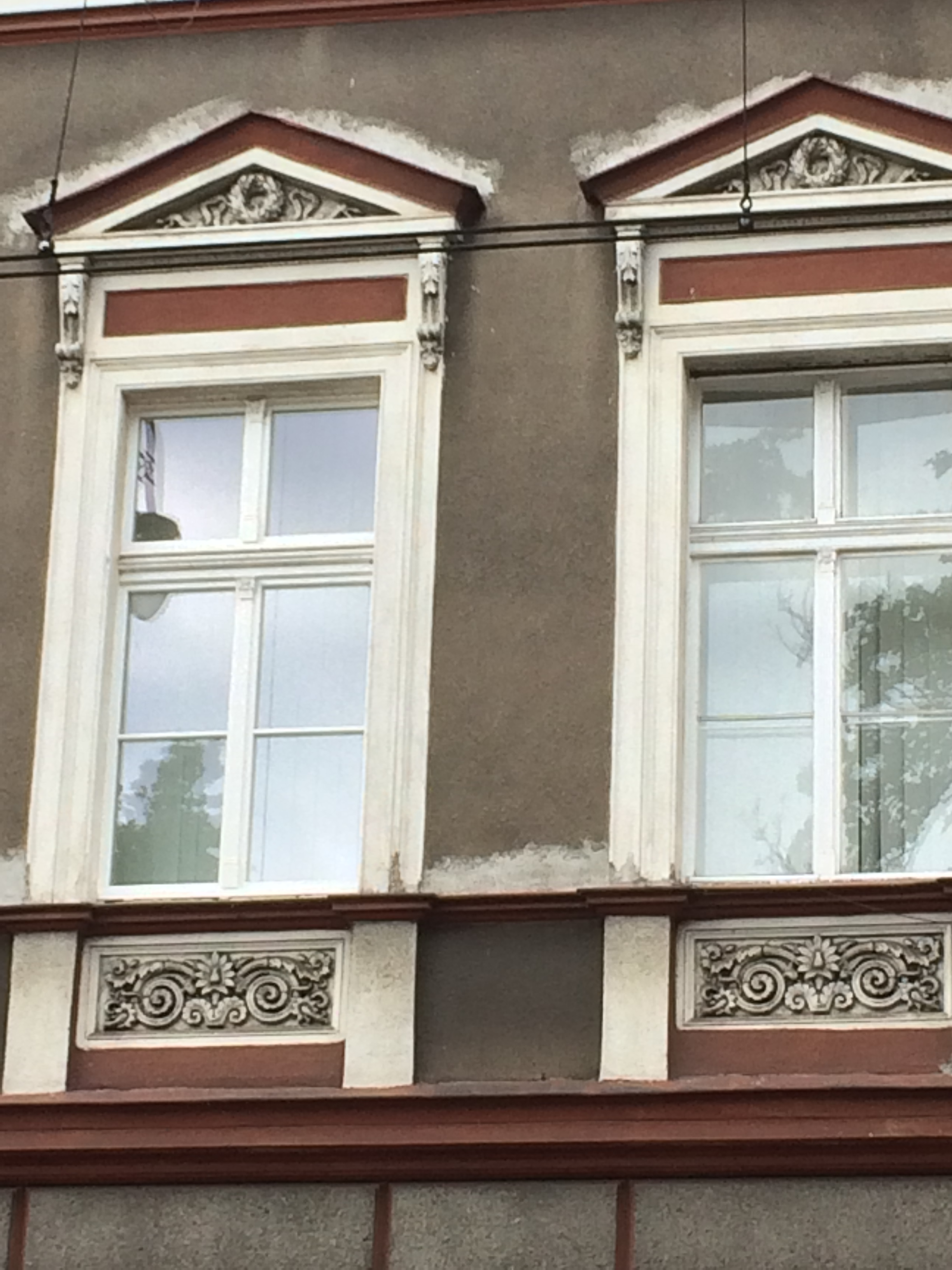
Windows adornement

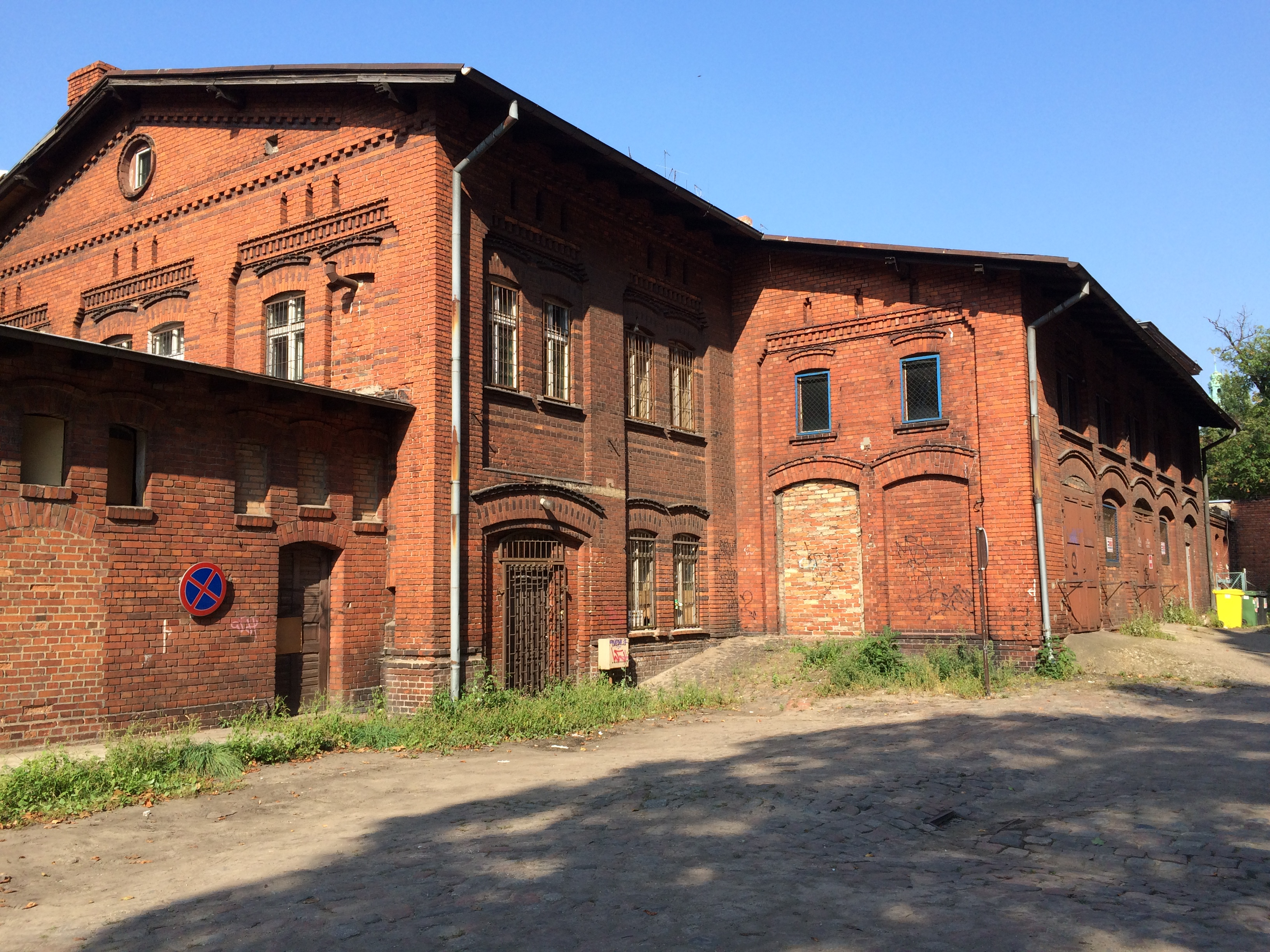
Old brick factory buildings

=== Tenement at 66 ===
1886, by A. Hardt

Italian Neo-Renaissance

Eduard Greuer, a locksmith was the first landlord of this tenement located at then Bahnhofstraße 66. In the 1910s the new landlord, Joseph Zawitaj, had his metal moulding workshop there.

The facade displays a typical Neo-Renaissance style, with Italian forms: triangular and curved pediments, cartouches beneath first floor windows, a minute avant-corps and a wrought iron entry gate.

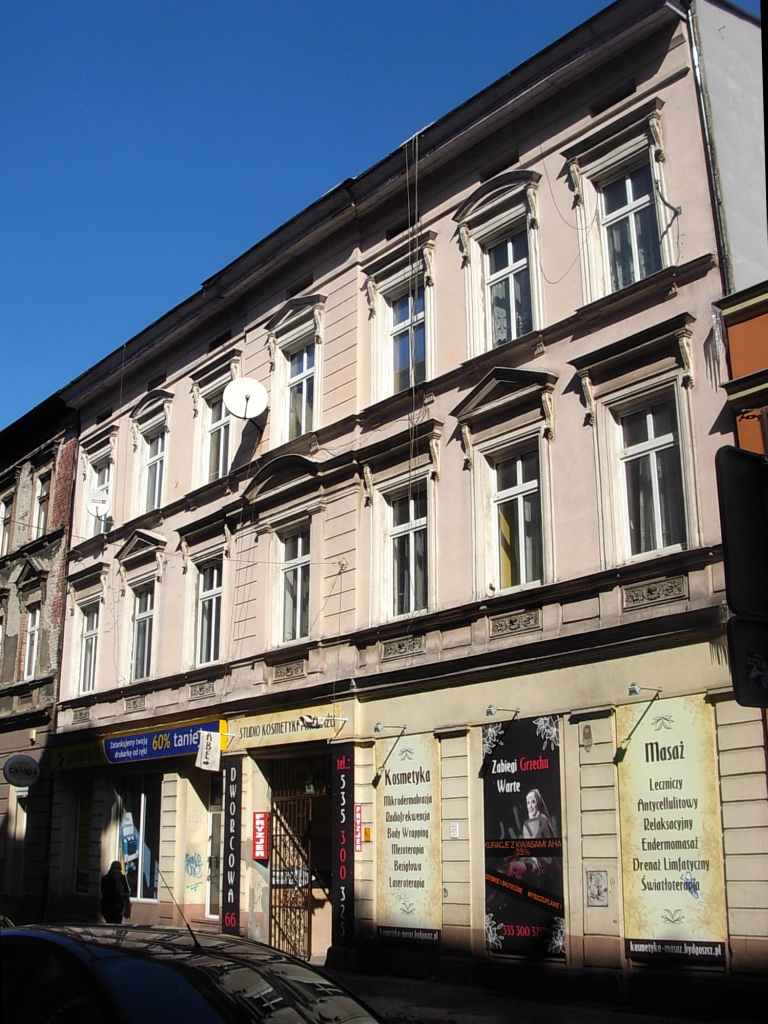
Facade on Dworcowa Street

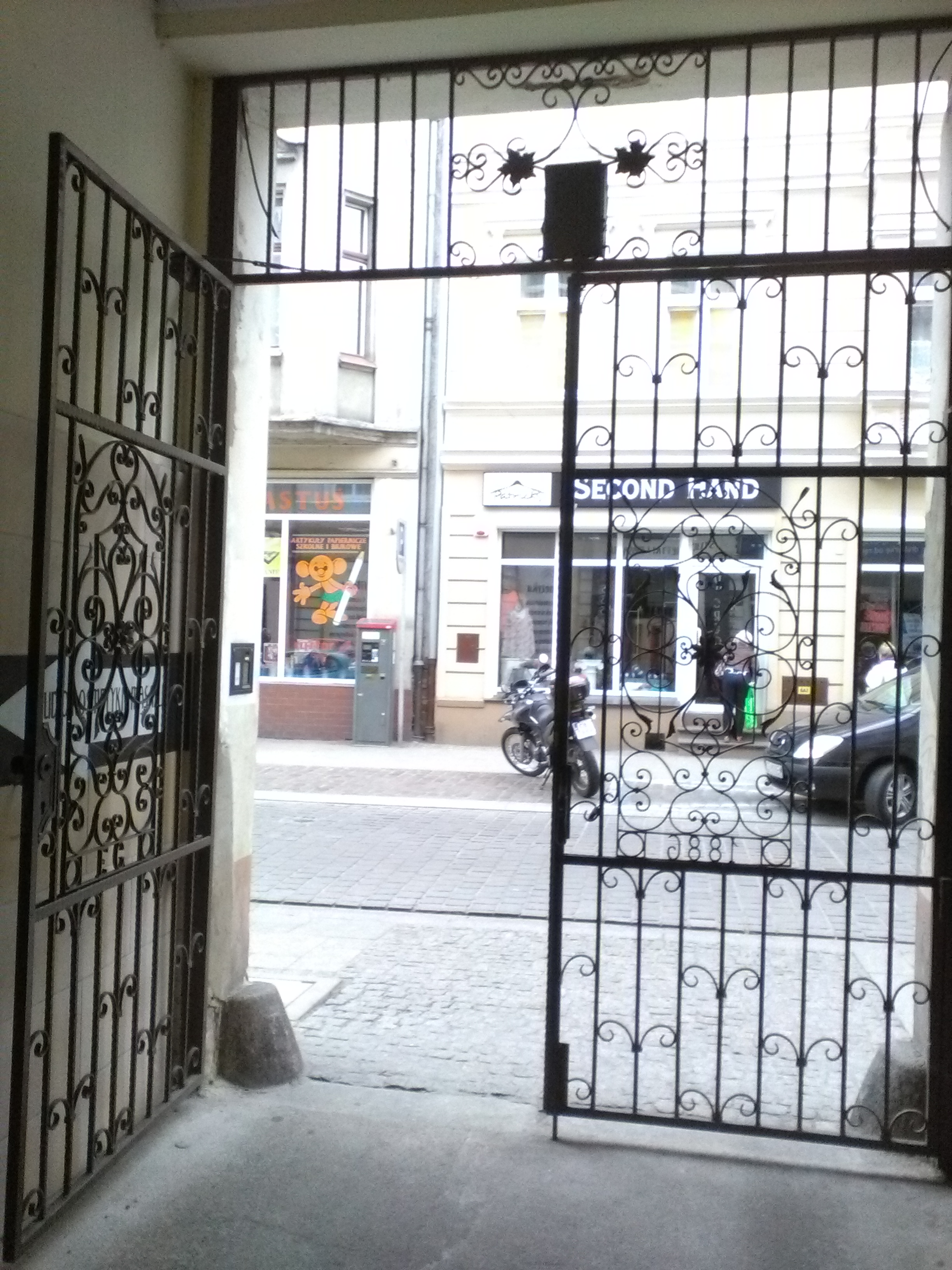
Wrought iron gate to the building

=== Erick Hecht tenement at 67 ===
1912–1913, by Otto Walter

Modern architecture

Erick Hecht, a bookseller who had his shop on 19 Dantzigerstraße, commissioned Berliner architect Otto Walther to design his house at Bahnhoffstraße 30. Otto Walther, at the time, had just finished realizing the department store Jedynak at the crossing with Gdańska Street.

The main elevation is overwhelmed with bas-reliefs, among which:

- A horse rider above the entrance gate;
- A fish, symbolizing the owner, since Hecht means pike in German;
- A 19th-century girl, another with horns, a baby's head, a man with royal attributes;
- A figure supposed to be Lady Godiva.

Since 2019, the ensemble is under heavy renovation works, so as to transform it into a luxurious residential building. Works were completed in beginning of 2025.

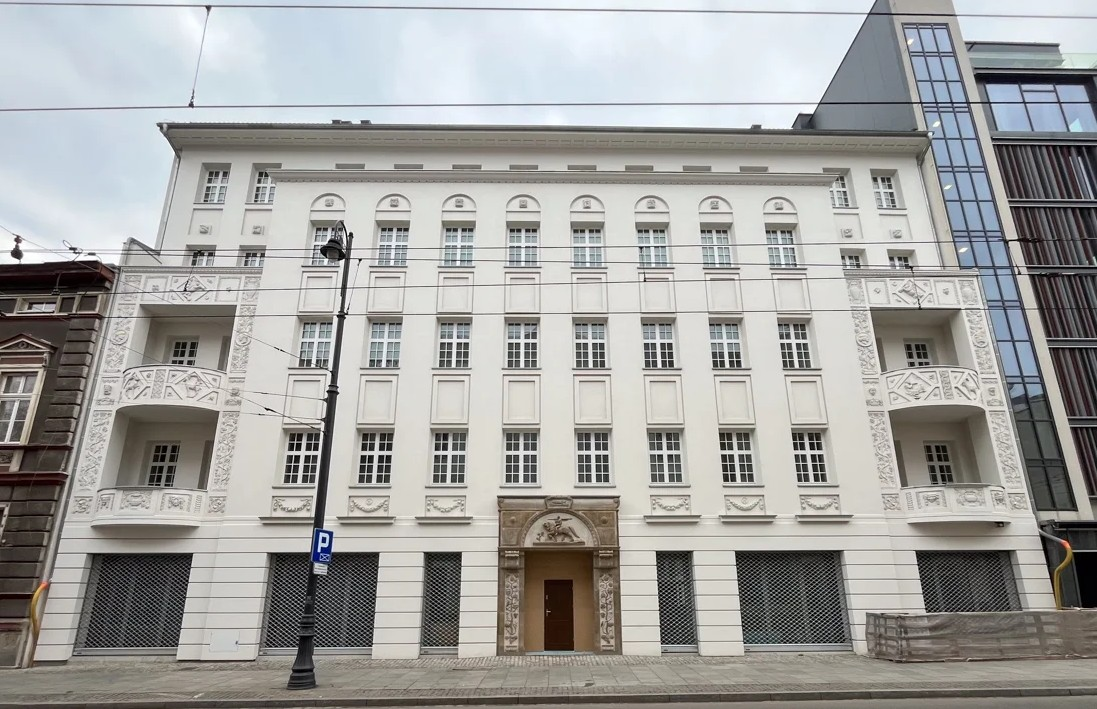
Renovate facade on Dworcowa Street

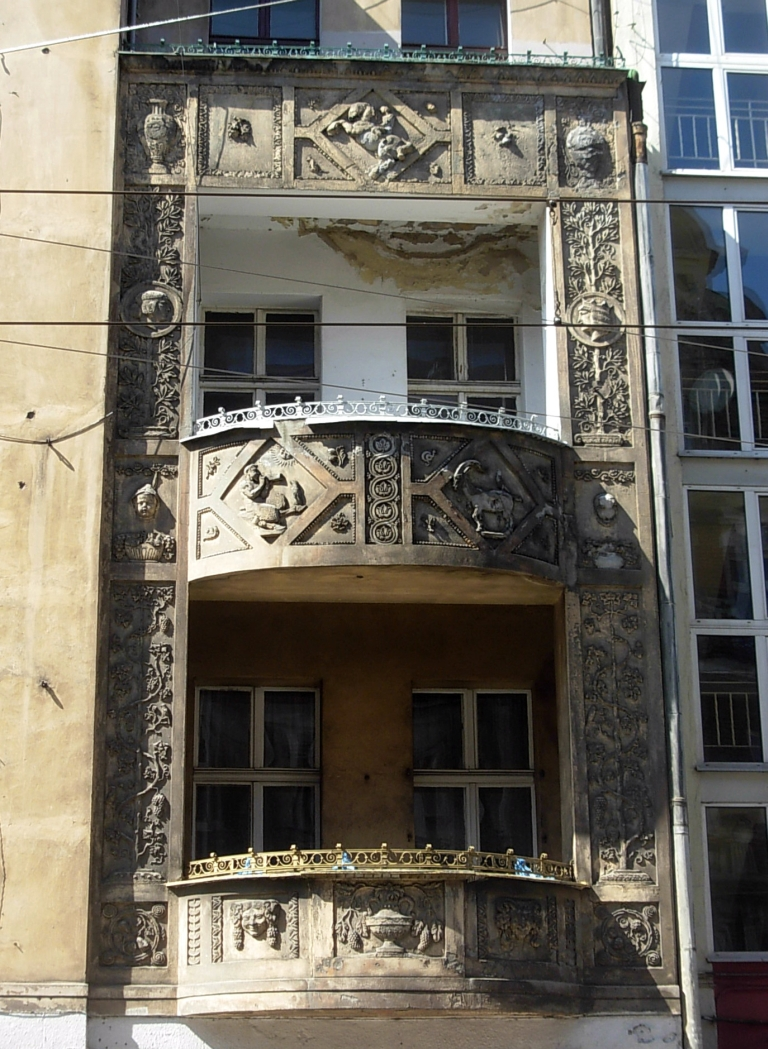
balconies with bas-reliefs

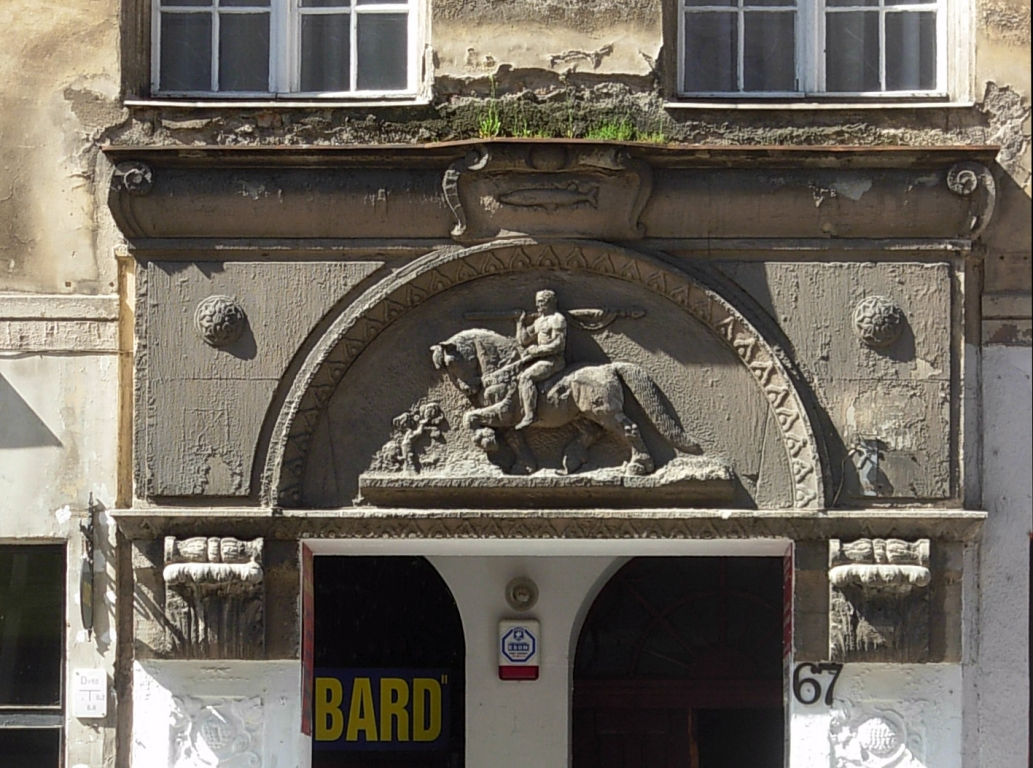
Detail of the tympanum

=== Tenement at 68 ===
1893–1894, by Karl Bergner

Eclecticism & Neo-Renaissance

The initial owner of the house at then Bahnhofstraße 65 was Karl Schultz, a metal craftsman.

The building echoes almost perfectly its neighbour at Nr.66. Same Neo-Renaissance features, identical size and similar architectural motifs.

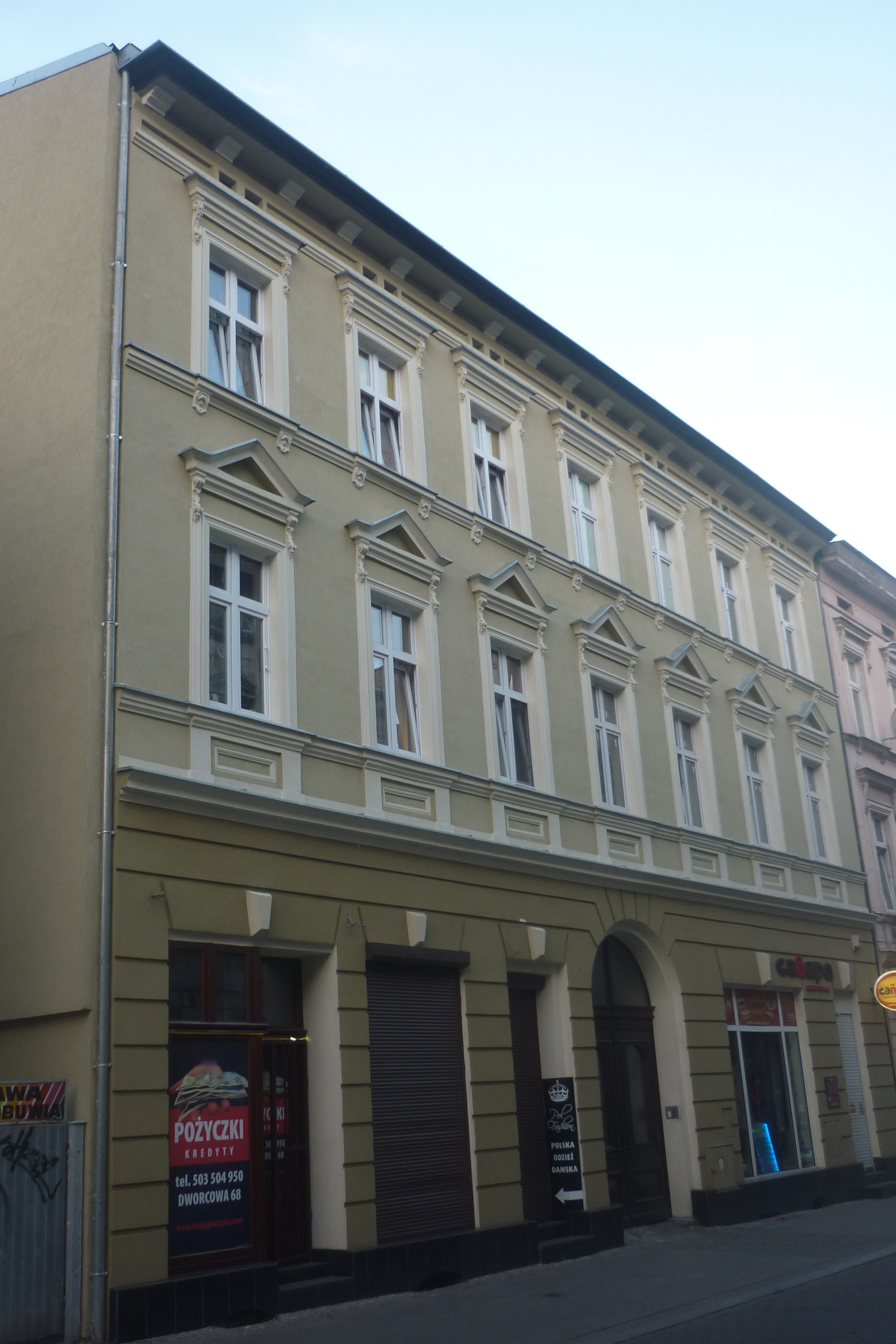
View from Dworcowa Street

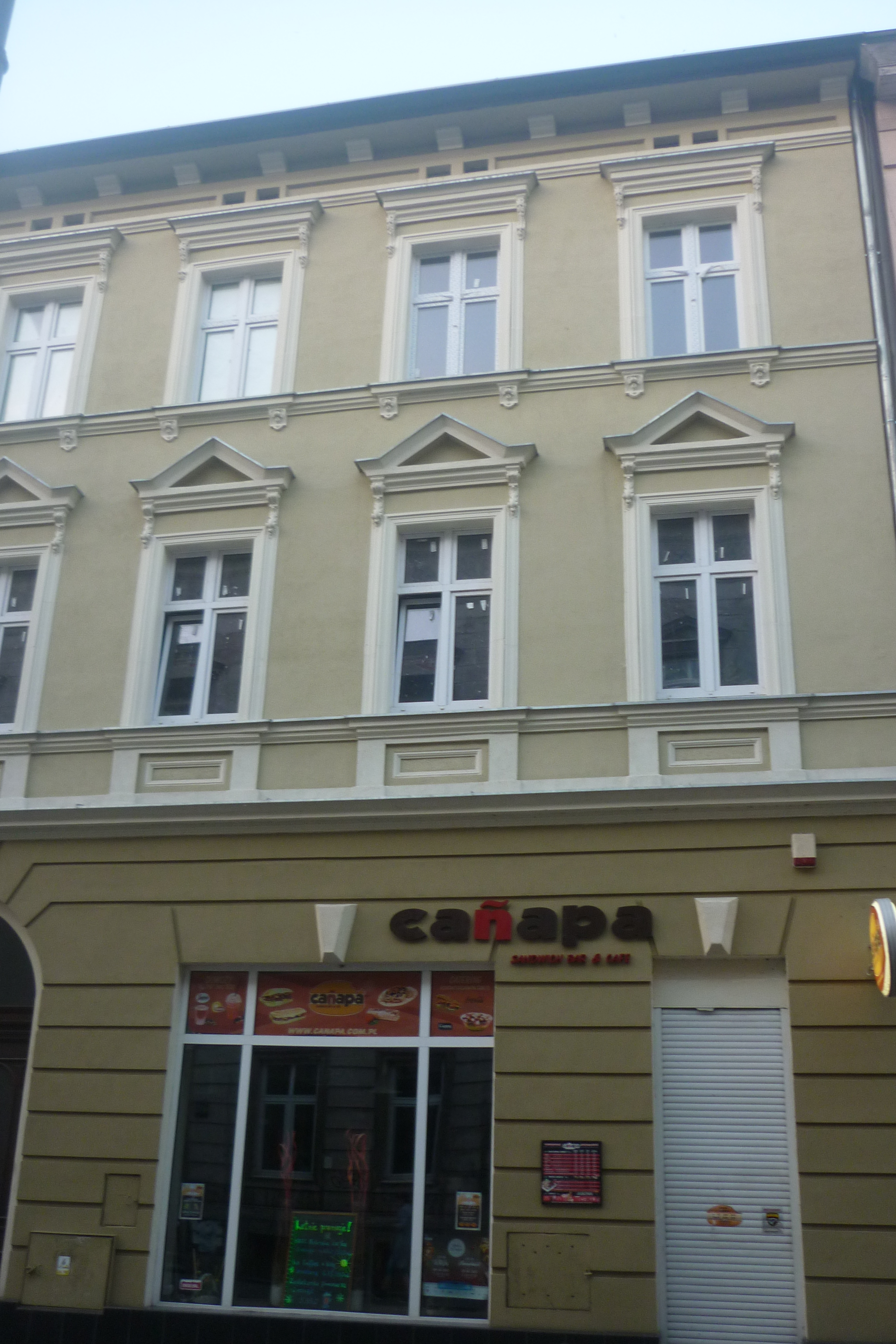
Facade detail

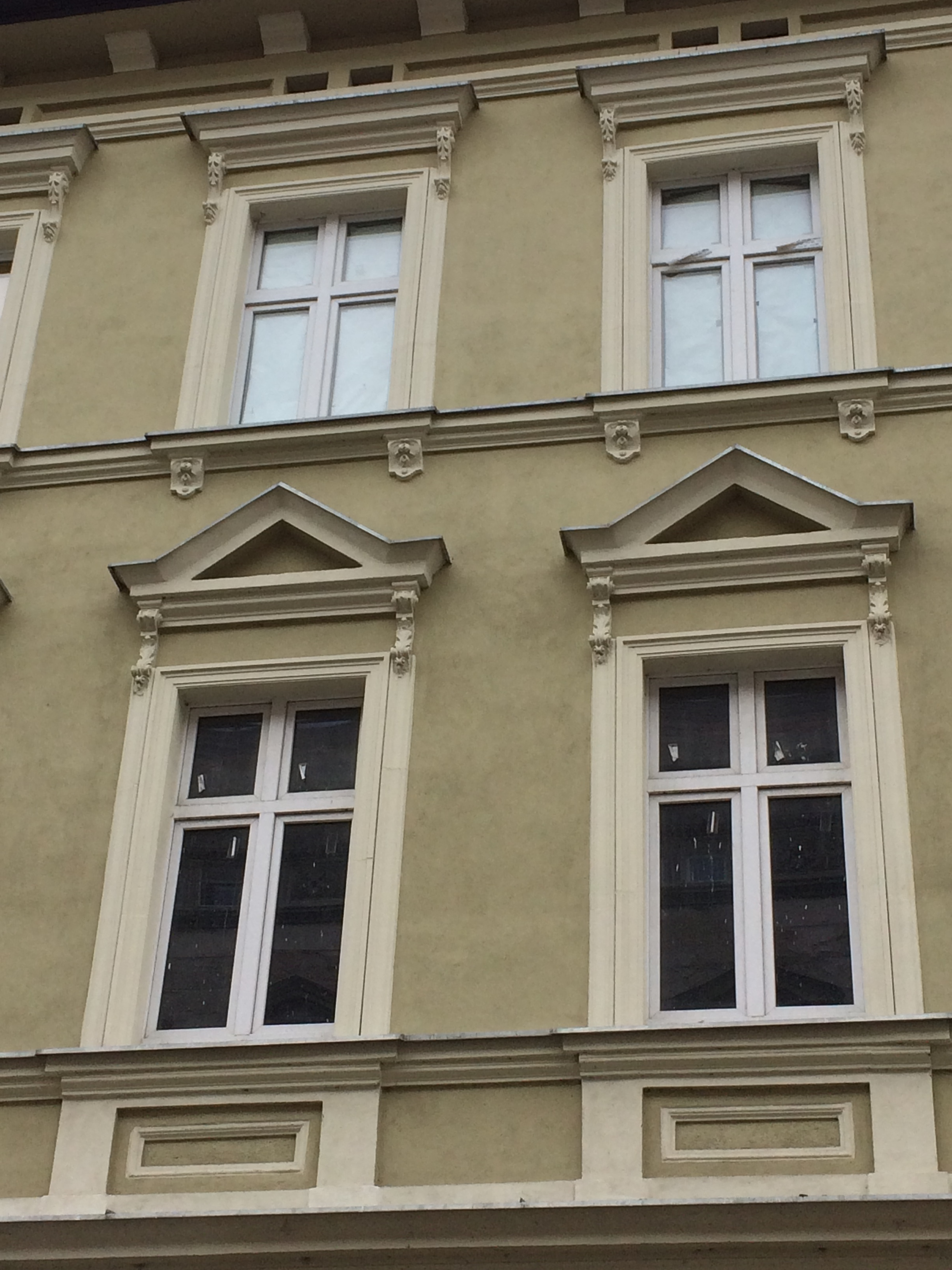
Detail of windows decoration

=== Hermann Dyck Tenement at 71, corner with Krolowa Jadwiga Street ===
1895–1896

Modern architecture

Hermann Dyck, a merchant selling steam sawmills, had the house at Bahnhoffstraße 31 erected by Fritz Weidner.

Rebuilt entirely in 1956, the facade lost its original Neo-Baroque features.

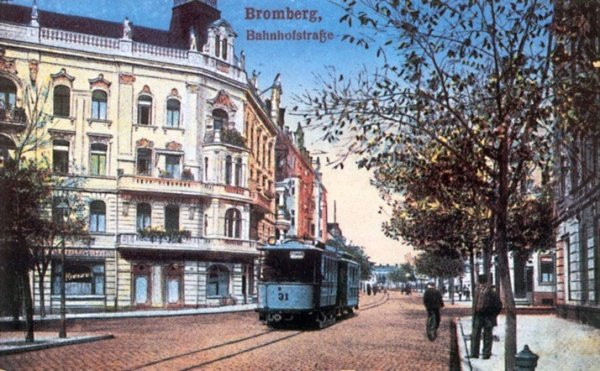
The building in the early 20th century

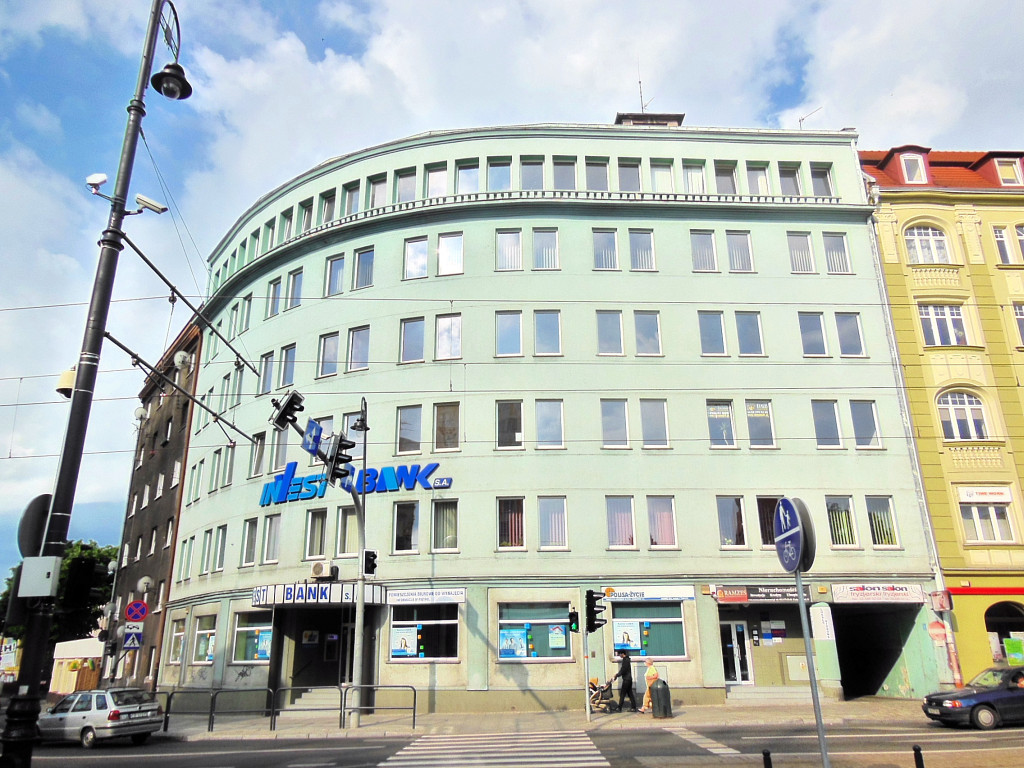
Corner on Dworcowa and Krolowej Jadwigi Street

=== Herold tenement, at 73 ===
1911–1912, by Otto Müller

Neo-Baroque

Fritz Herold, a rentier, had this building located at Bahnhoffstraße 31a constructed by Otto Müller. He moved there in 1898. Unfortunately, the tenement burned down in 1945. The architect Fritz Weidner has lived there with his family until 1937. From 1922 onwards, the Polish journalist, writer and national activist Stefania Tuchołkowa lived there with her family.

Urban-type building, the facade displays bay windows and bow windows with an inclination to Art Nouveau: round gable top, vegetal motifs, curved cartouches and an adorned gate.

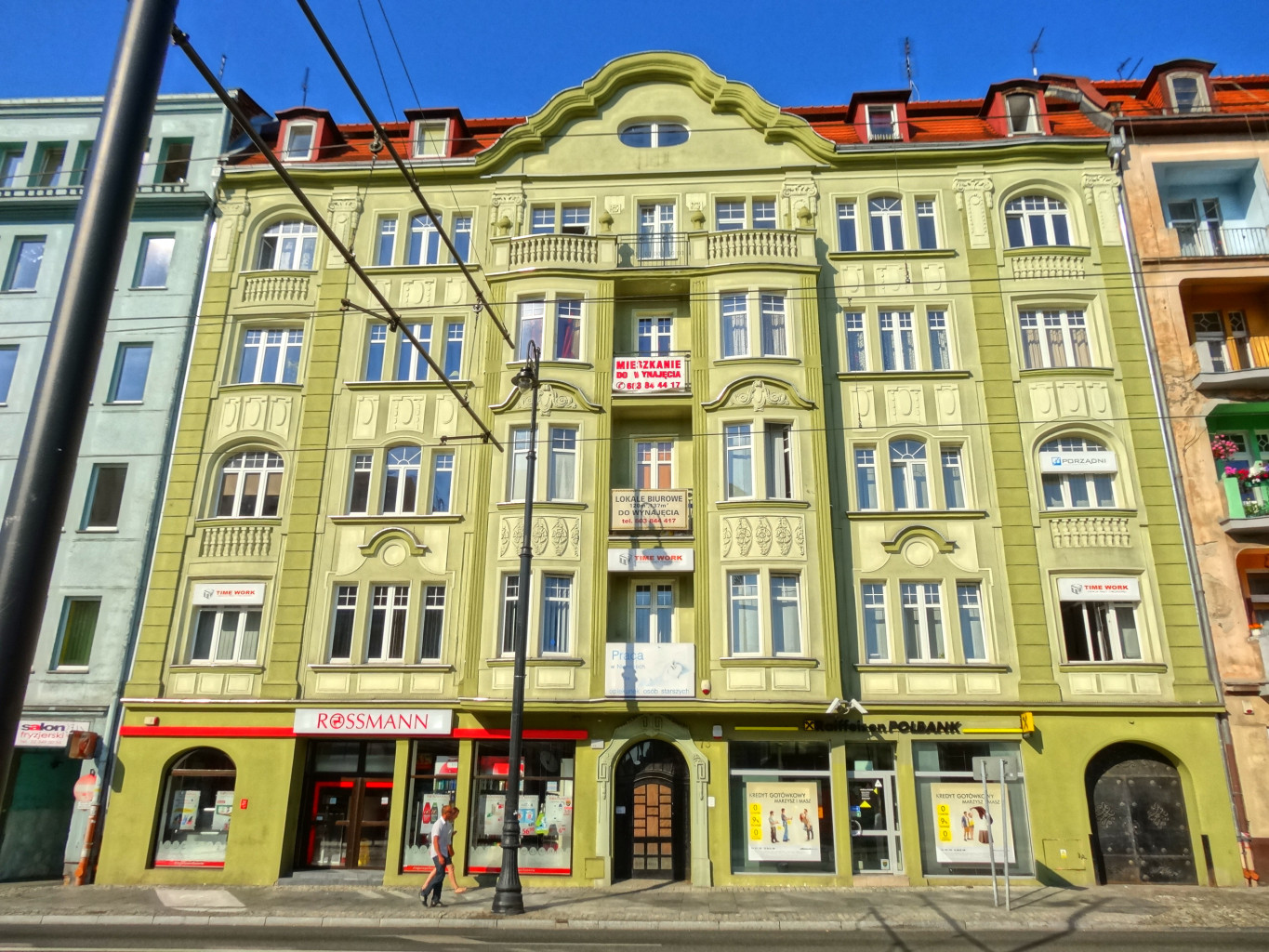
Facade onto Dworcowa Street

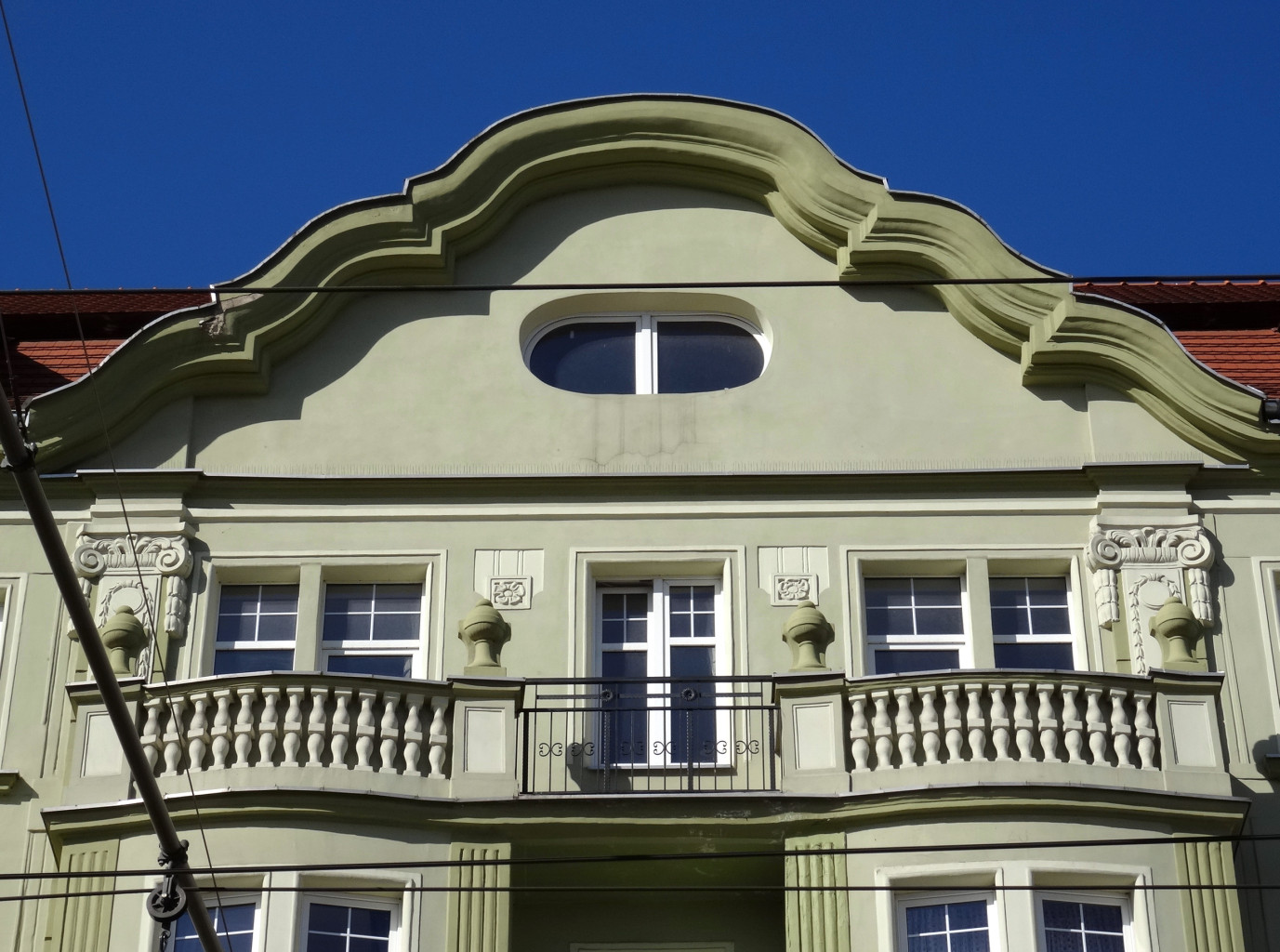
Balcony topping the bay window

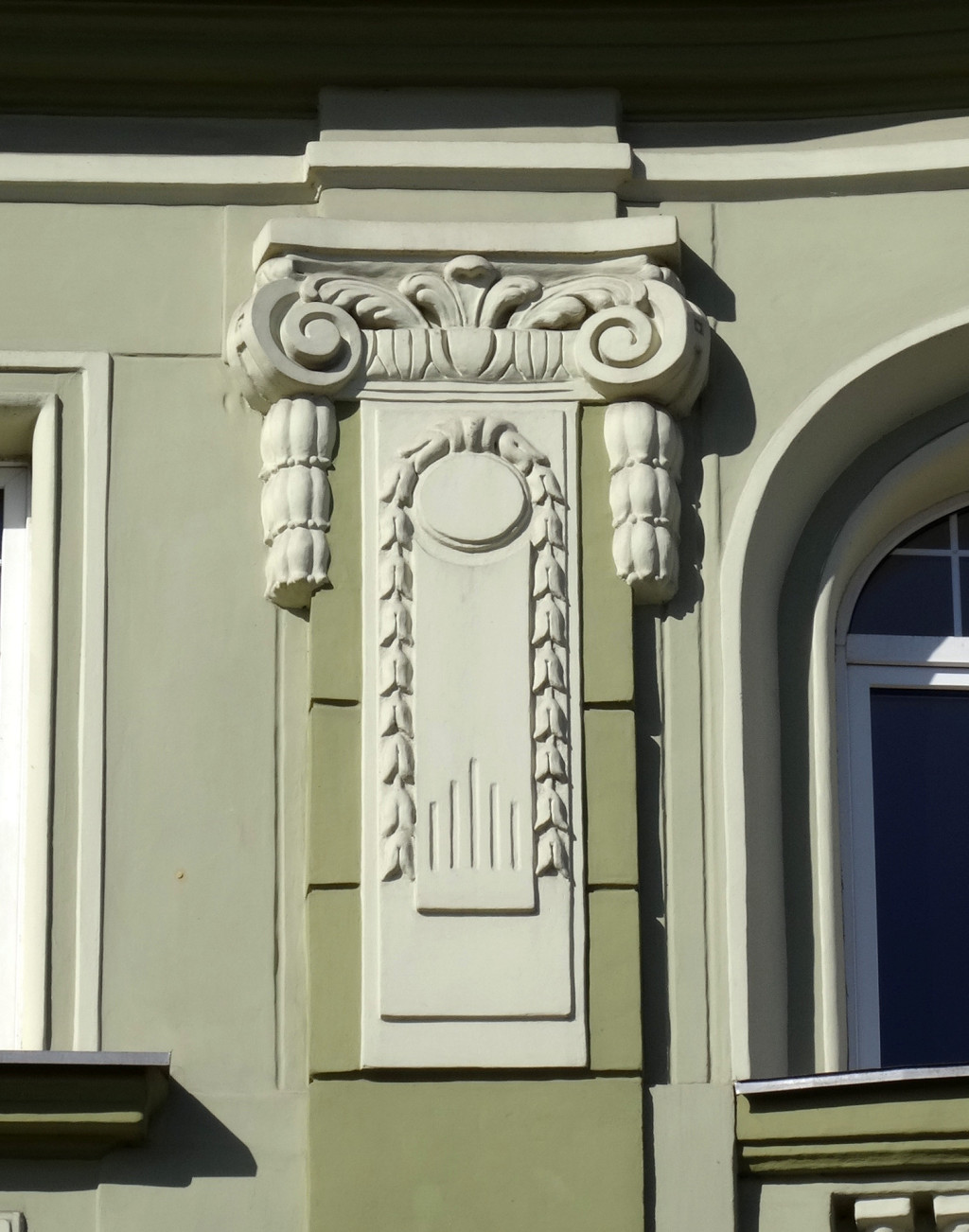
motifs detail

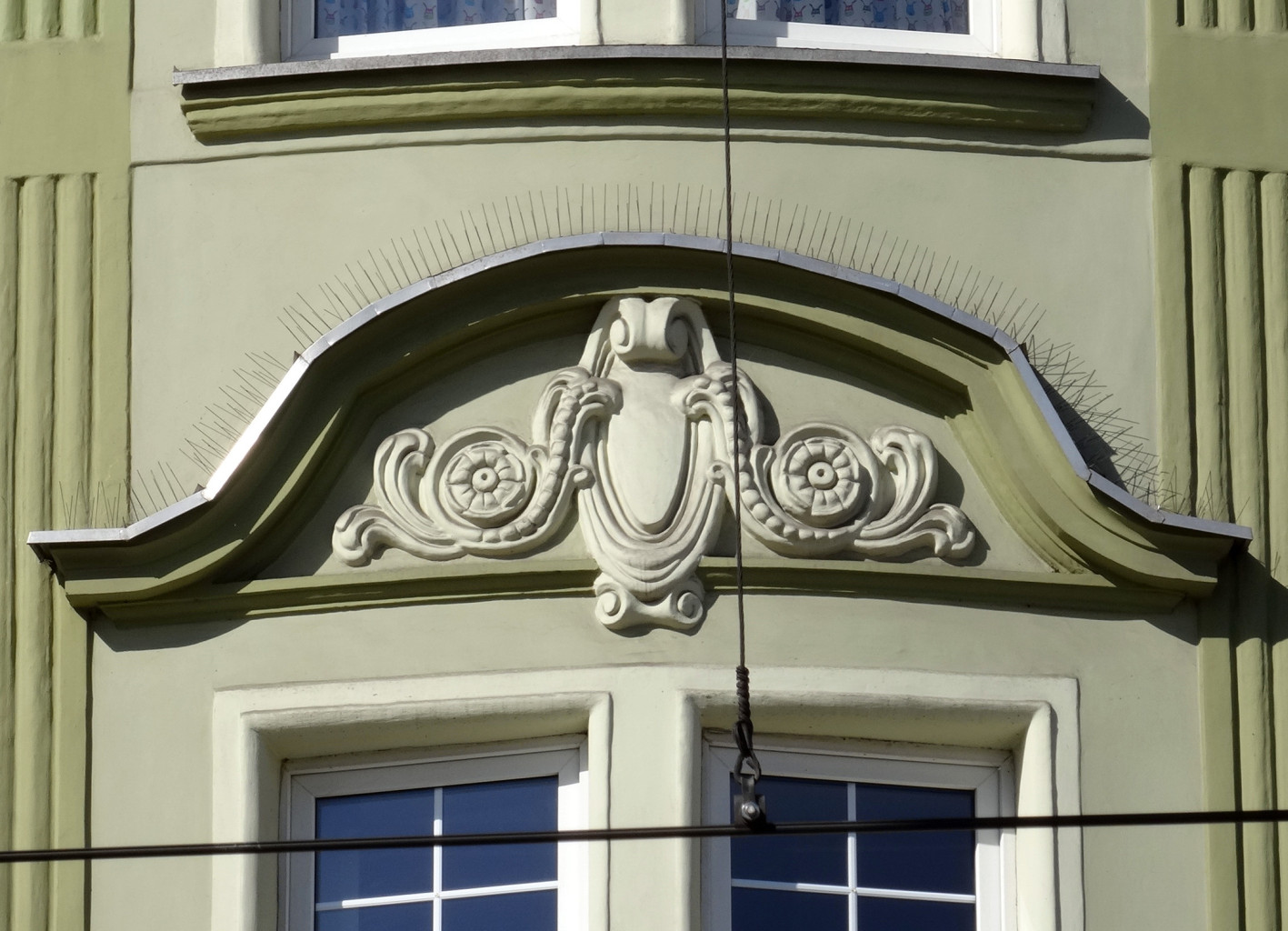
motifs detail

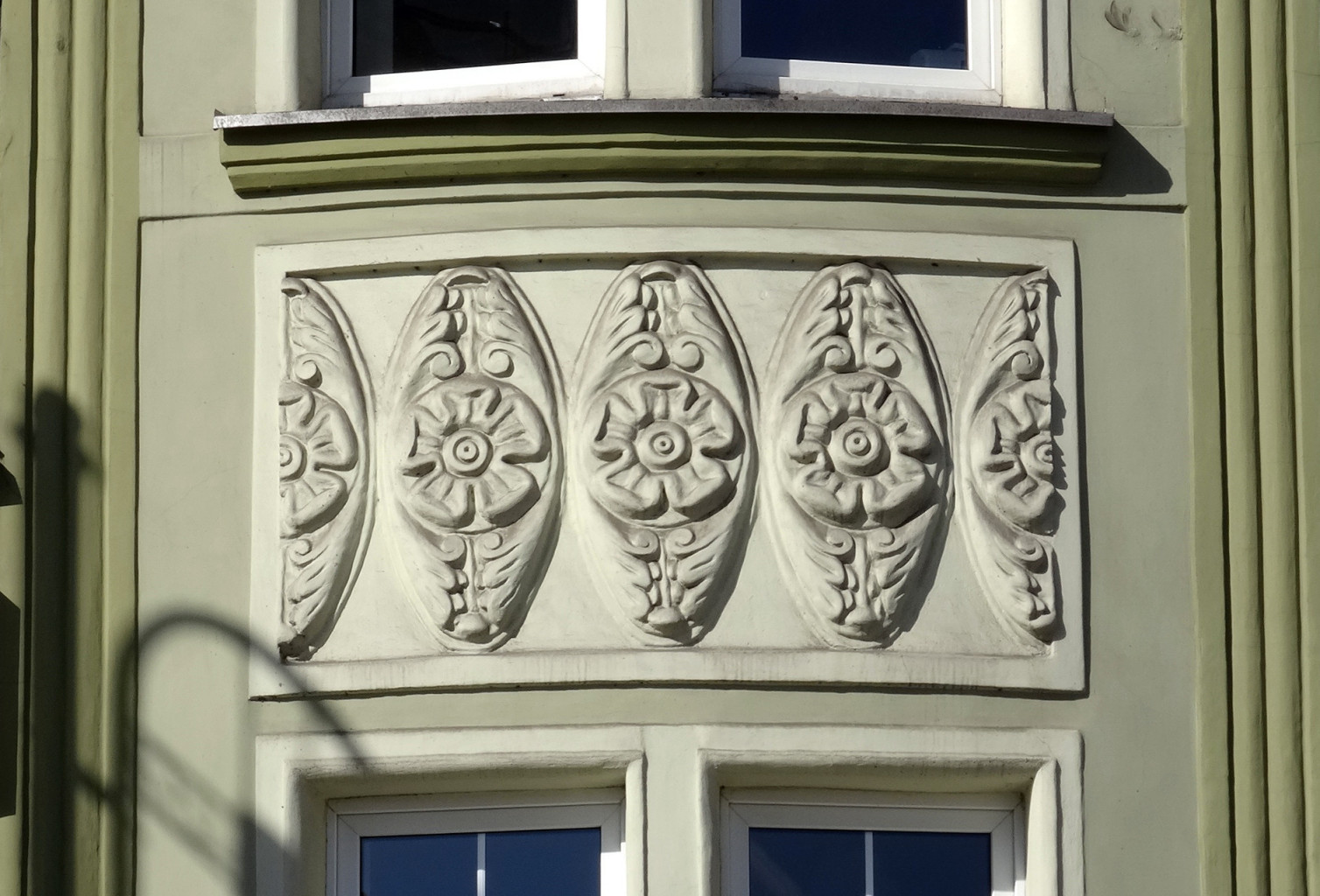
motifs detail

=== Ernst Baudelow tenement, at 74 - corner with Matejki street ===
1895

Eclecticism

Ernst Baudelow, a merchant, ordered the construction of this building at the end of the 19th century. Between 1908 and 1925, the tenement, then at Bahnhoffstraße 62 was an hotel, Hotel Darheim.

The edifice is typical of Eclecticism, as one can encounter in downtown Bydgoszcz. The elevation on Dworcowa is characterised by heavy pediments and large wrought iron balconies supported by corbels. On Matejko street, the facade is less adorned.

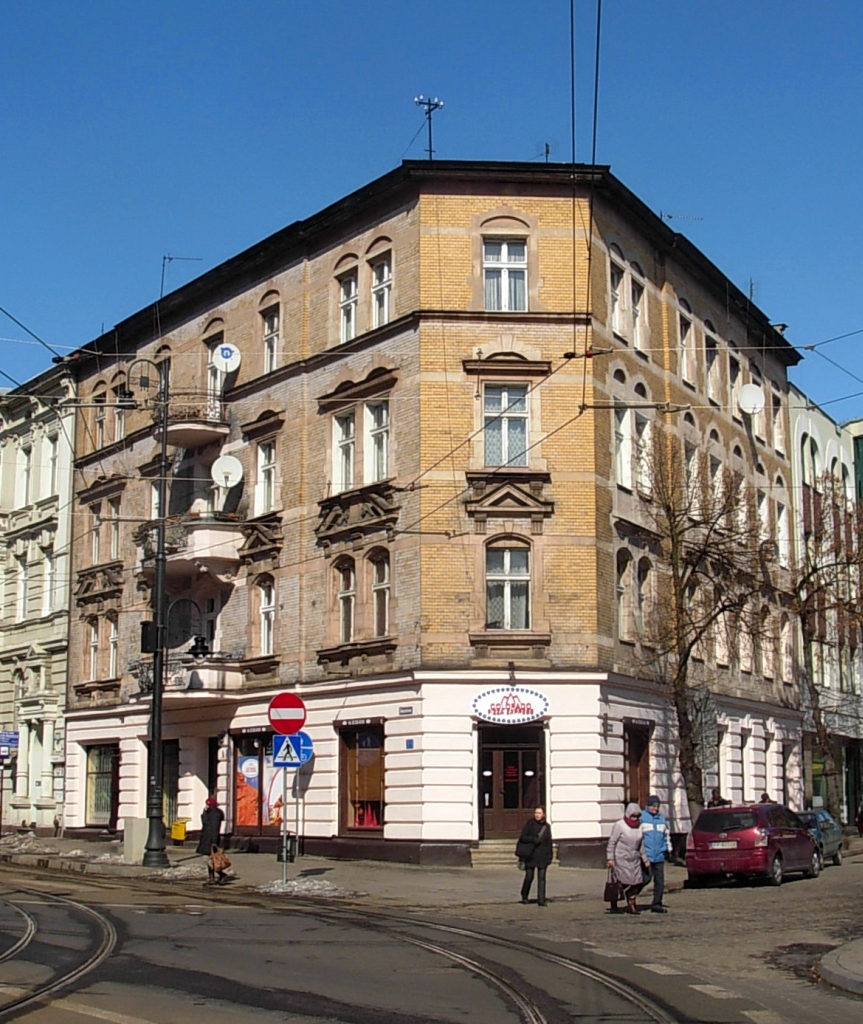
Corner house on Dworcowa and Matejki streets

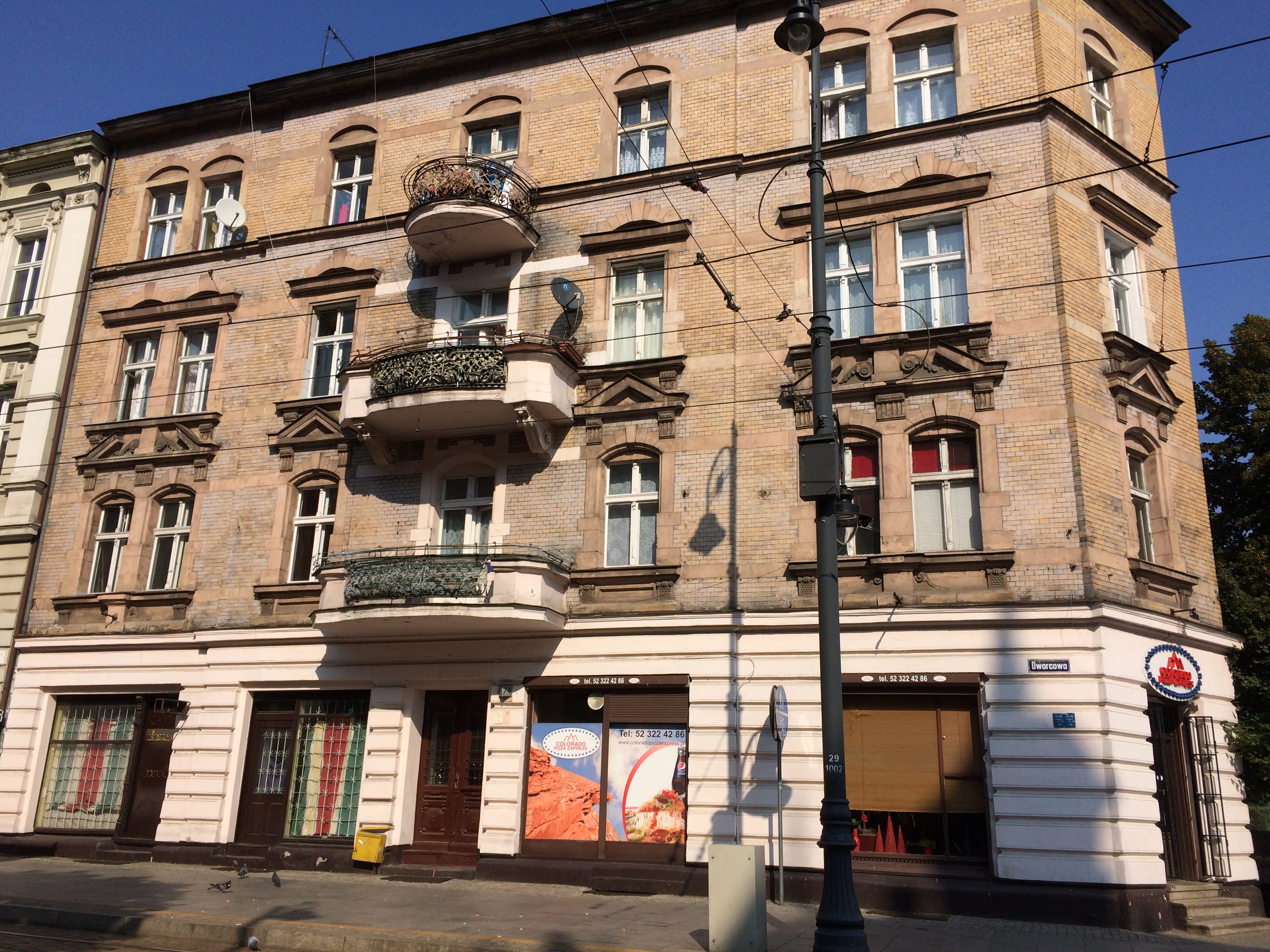
Facade onto Dworcowa

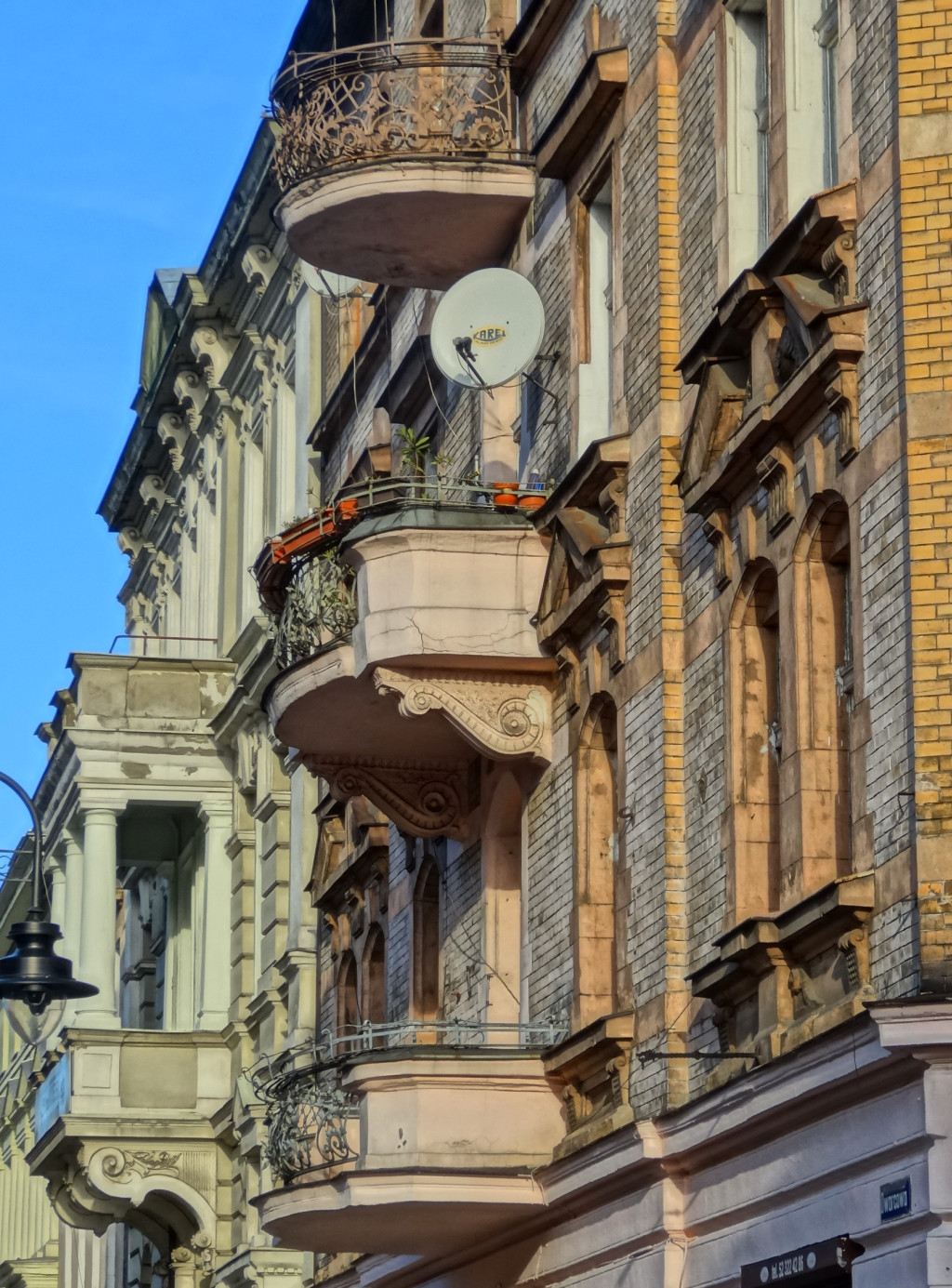
balconies on Dworcowa street

=== Tenement at 75 ===
1911–1912, by Otto Müller

Neo-Baroque

Richard Hoppe, a preacher, was the first owner of this tenement at then Bahnhoffstraße 31b. Andrzej Szwalbe, the first director of Pomeranian Philharmonic from 1953 to 1991, lived there. A commemorative plaque was unveiled on June 30, 2003.

Few elements survived time, especially the architectural details. Only the decoration of the gate still displays vegetal forms crowned by a coat of arms containing a lamb of God. The rest of the facade is balanced by two bay windows flanked by loggias, with balconies in the middle of the lot.

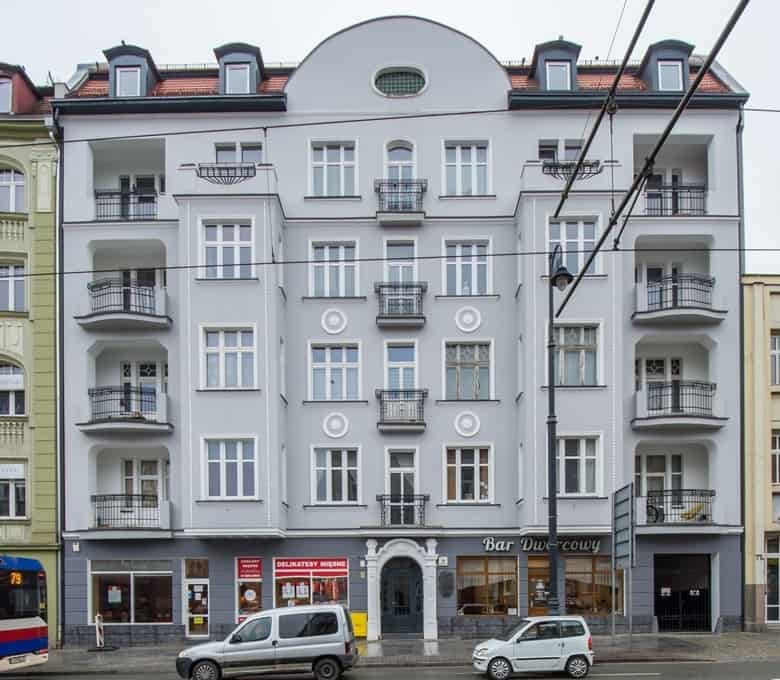
Renovated facade in 2022

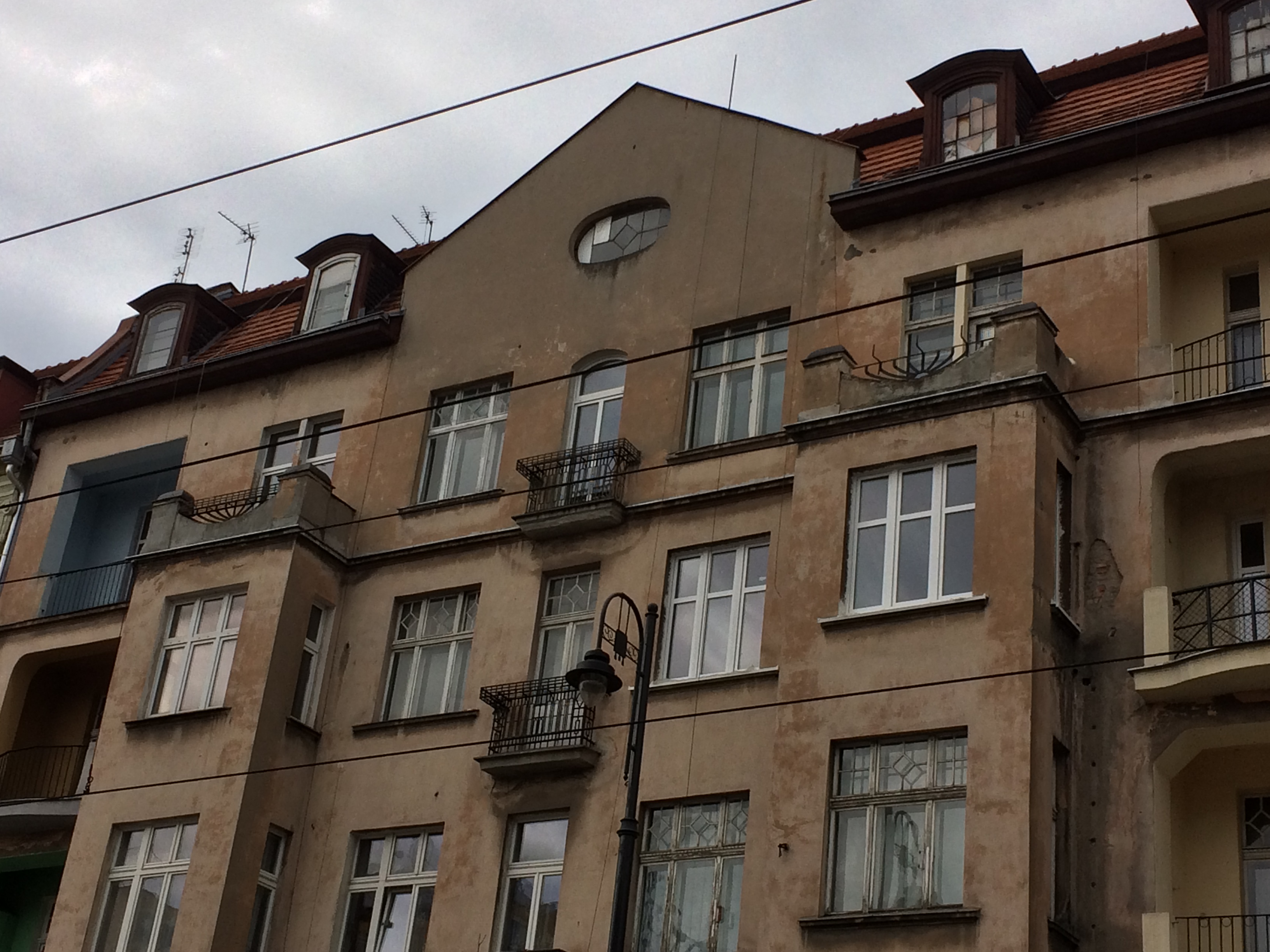
View of the gable

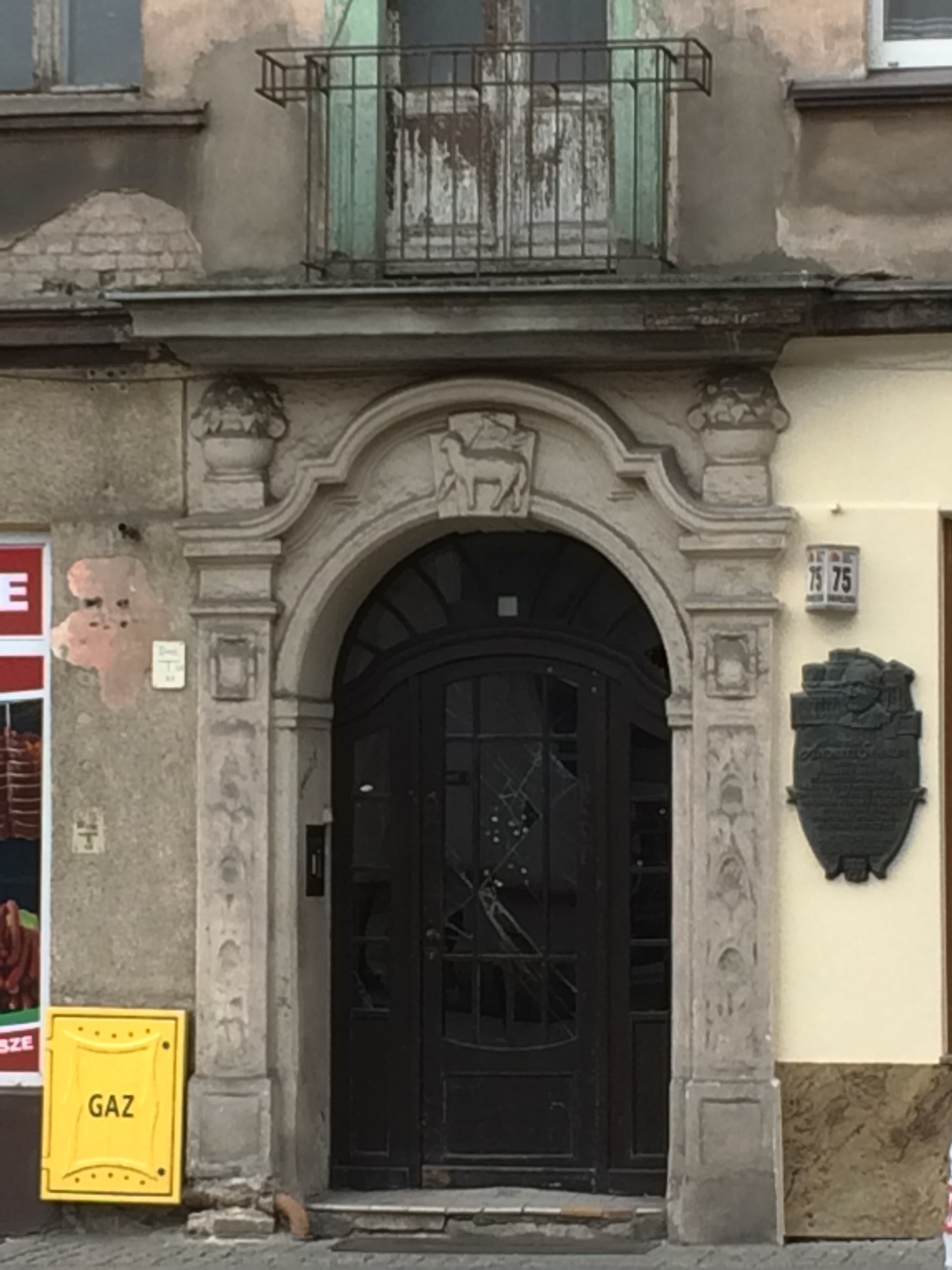
Main gate

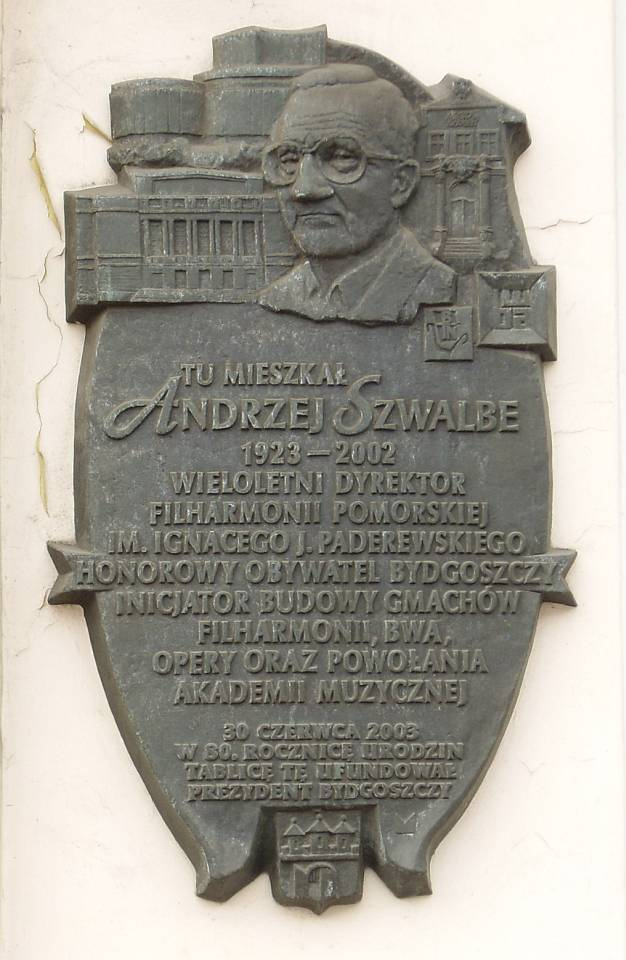
Memorial plaque for Andrzej Szwalbe

=== Tenement at 76 ===
1860

Eclecticism & Neo-Baroque elements

Joseph Schreiber, a miller, was the first owner of Bahnhoffstraße 61.

Particularly noticeable elements are:

- A highly decorated gate frame, flanked by columns and crowned by a pediment;
- A grand bay window, sheltering a loggia, supported by heavy corbels, surrounded by columns and topped by a small terrace (building).
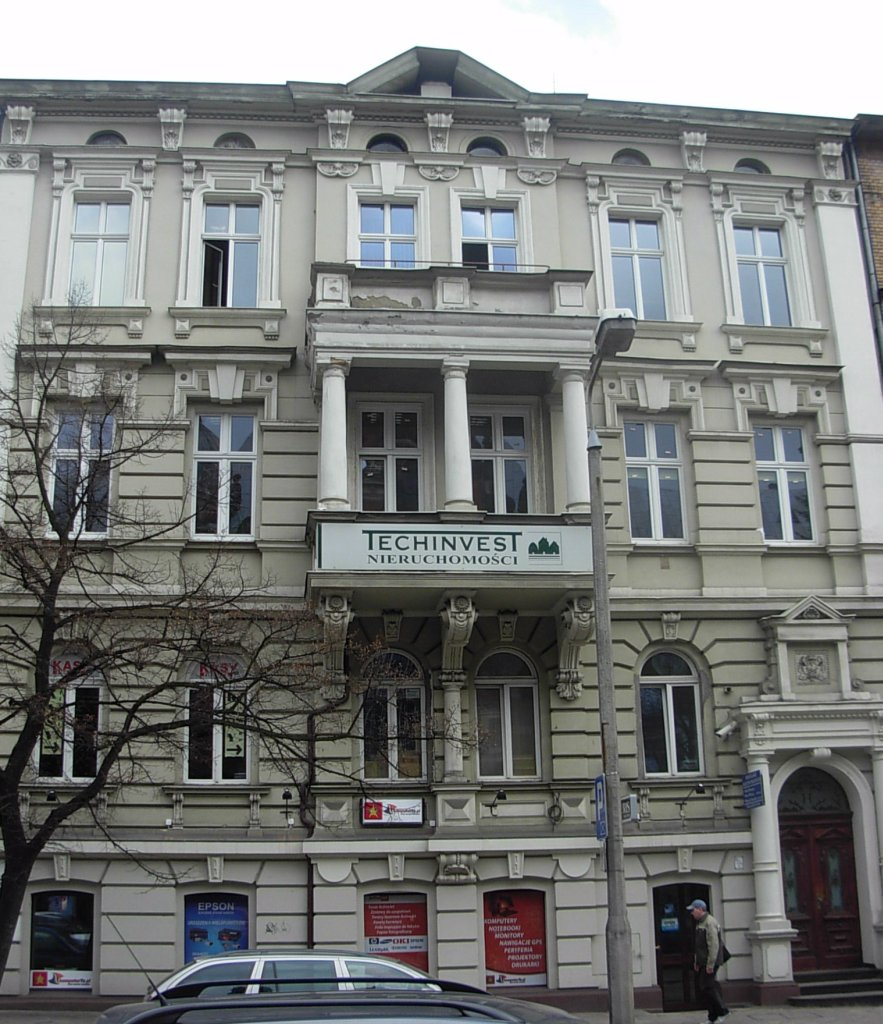
Facade on Dworcowa Street

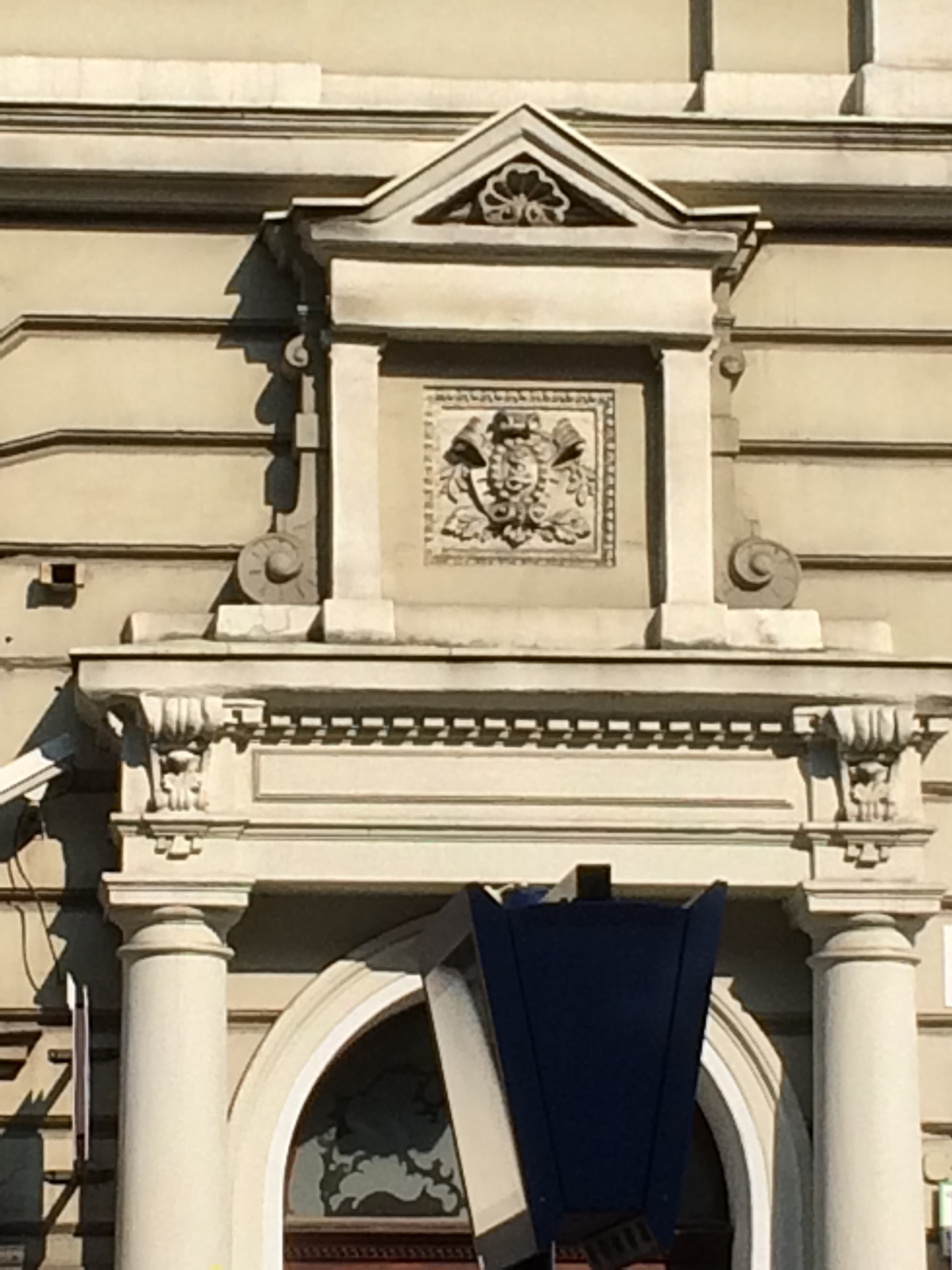
Detail of the adorned gate

=== Albin Cohnfeld tenement, at 77 ===
1876, by Karl Bergner

Eclecticism, elements of Neo-baroque

The Cohnfeld family, Gustav, Albin then their heirs, owned the plot at Bahnhofstraße 32 even before the erection of the present edifice, and kept it until the mid-1910s.

The facade, newly refurbished in 2020, has a rich Eclectic ornamentation. One can quote, among others, a highly adorned wrought iron balcony and bay window ensemble with sculpted atlants, elaborated ornaments, and a cartouche containing the initials CA for Albin Cohnfeld, commissioner of the building. The entire facade, topped by a table corbel, possess on second and third floors a very rich decoration, with delicate flower and vegetal motifs, in pediments or around the openings. Above the bay window stands an onion dome steeple.

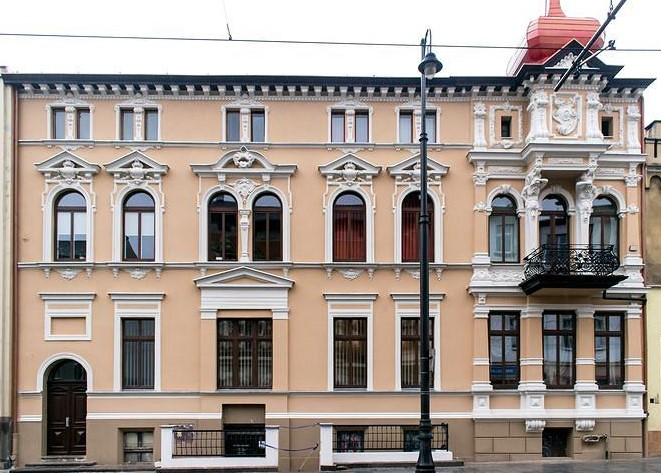
Facade on Dworcowa Street

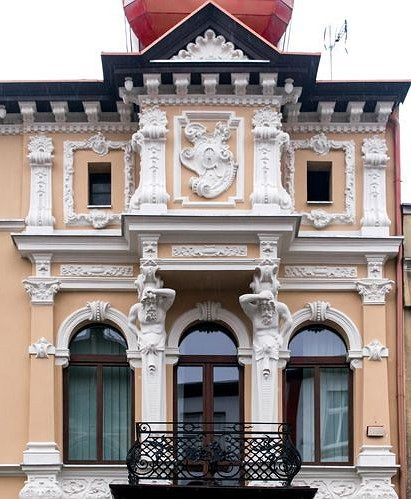
Balcony and initials within the cartouche

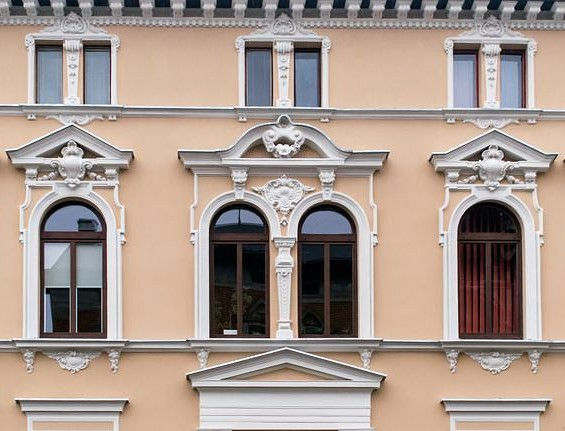
Stuccoed motifs

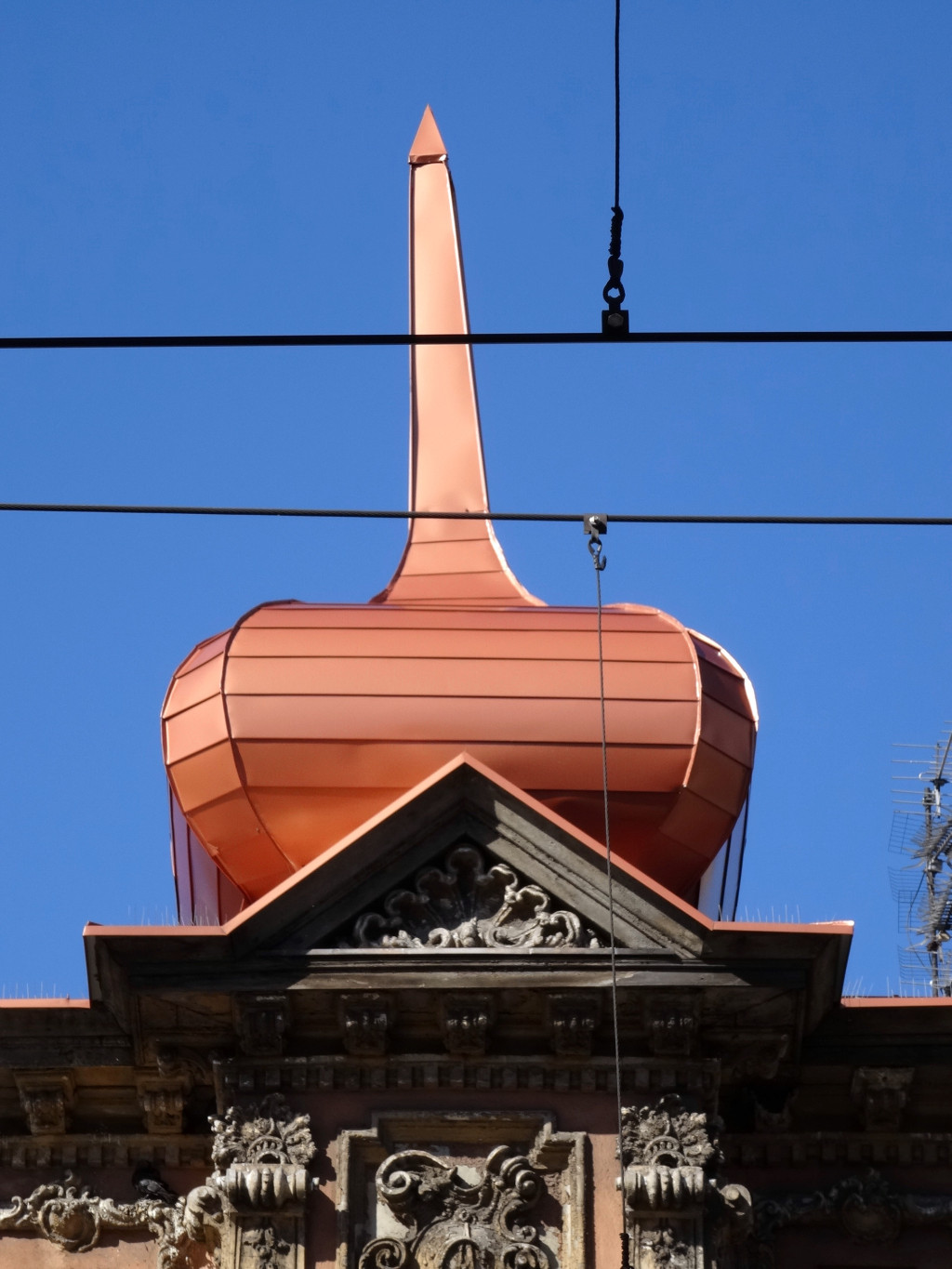
Onion dome steeple

=== Hotel Asystenta at 79, corner with Sobieskiego Street ===
1870, 1971

Eclecticism

Initially owned by a restaurateur, Gustav Müller, at its erection, the house at Bahnhofstraße 33 was then bought by Julius Schliep in 1889 to run a hotel Schliep's Hotel. In 1920, new landlord Leon Ciemniak renamed it Hotel International, then Hotel Metropol (1932), and Hotel Asystenta (English: Assistance hotel) in the 1970s, linked to the Medical Academy in Bydgoszcz (today Collegium Medicum UMK).

The refurbishing of the 1970s gave to the facade forms of Modern architecture. Anyhow, its general shape reveals its old roots (gables type for instance), in a way similar to one of the old house at 37 Gdańska Street. The building was refurbished in 2021.

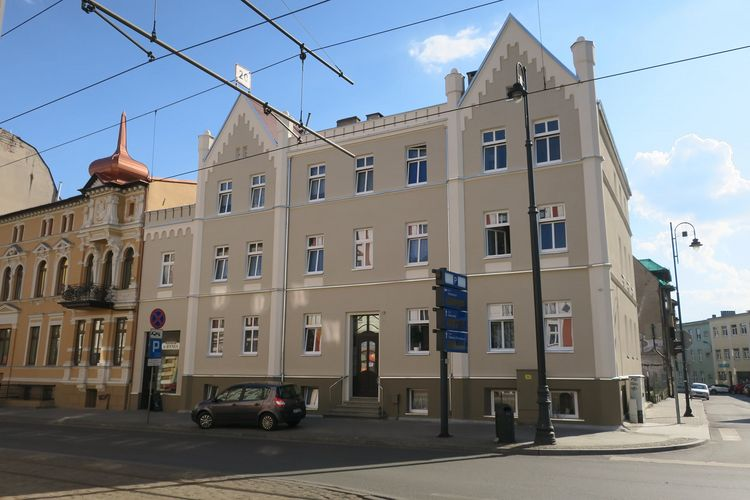
Ronvated facade on Dworcowa Street

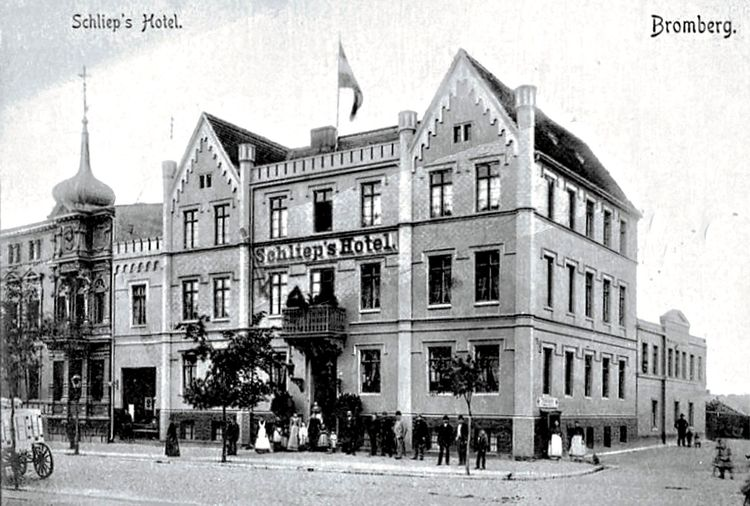
Schliep's hotel ca 1900

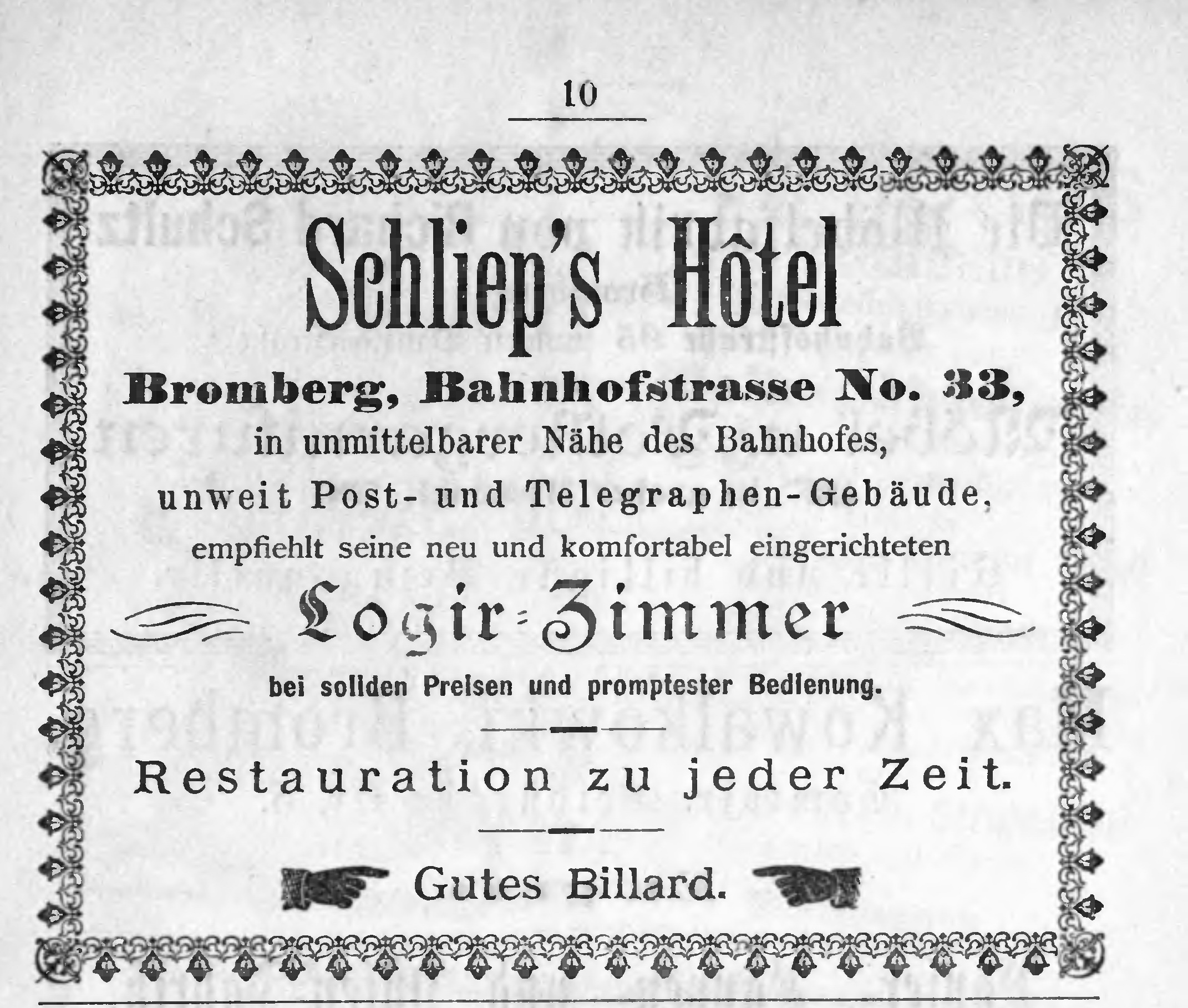
Schliep's hotel advertising in 1894

=== Foreign Language Teacher Training College at 80 ===
1891-1892

Eclecticism

The building at then Bahnhoffstraße 59 has been designed to house the activity of Franz Bengsch, who ran a wood transport company there until the end of World War I. During the interwar period, the tenement was owned by the Ramme Brothers, who had a workshop in Grunwaldzka street for repairing agricultural machines. Since 1990, the building houses the Foreign Language Teacher Training College or NKJO (Polish: Nauczycielskie Kolegium Języków Obcych w Bydgoszczy), subordinated to universities of Poznań and Warsaw. A plaque has been placed on the facade in honor of railway engineer Ernest Malinowski (1818–1899), patron of NKJO Spanish section.

The facade has reminiscences of Neo-Renaissance elements, with its bare wall and the overall symmetry of the ensemble.

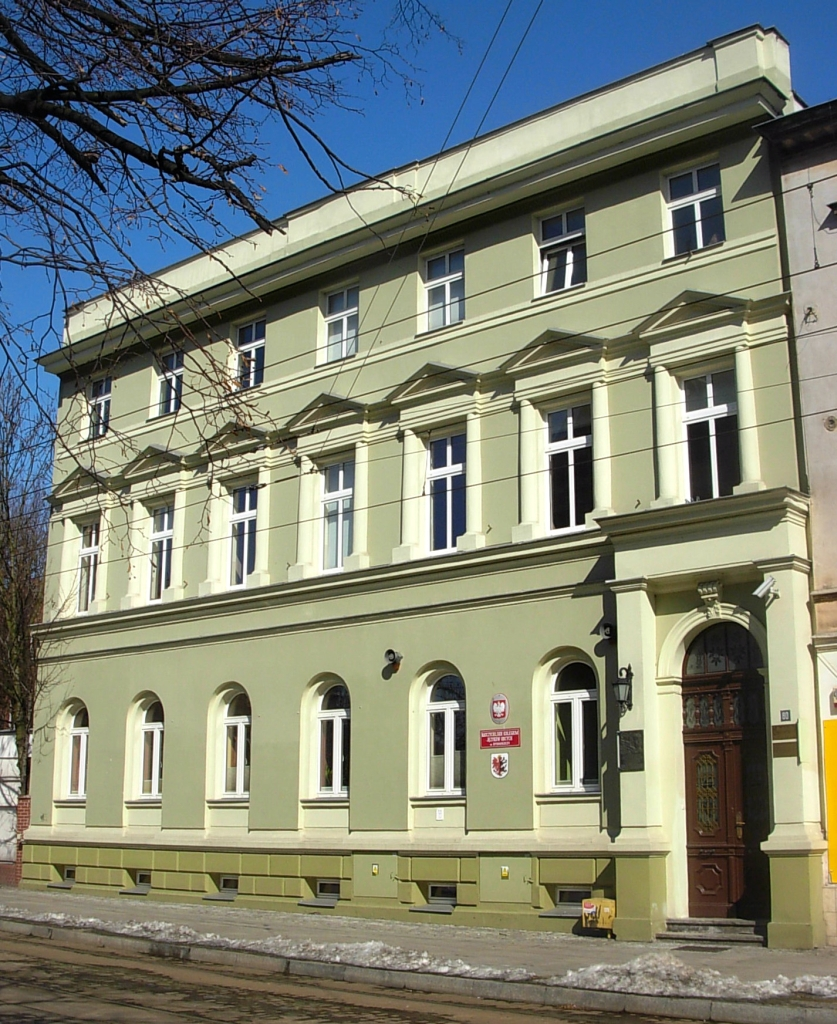
Facade on Dworcowa Street

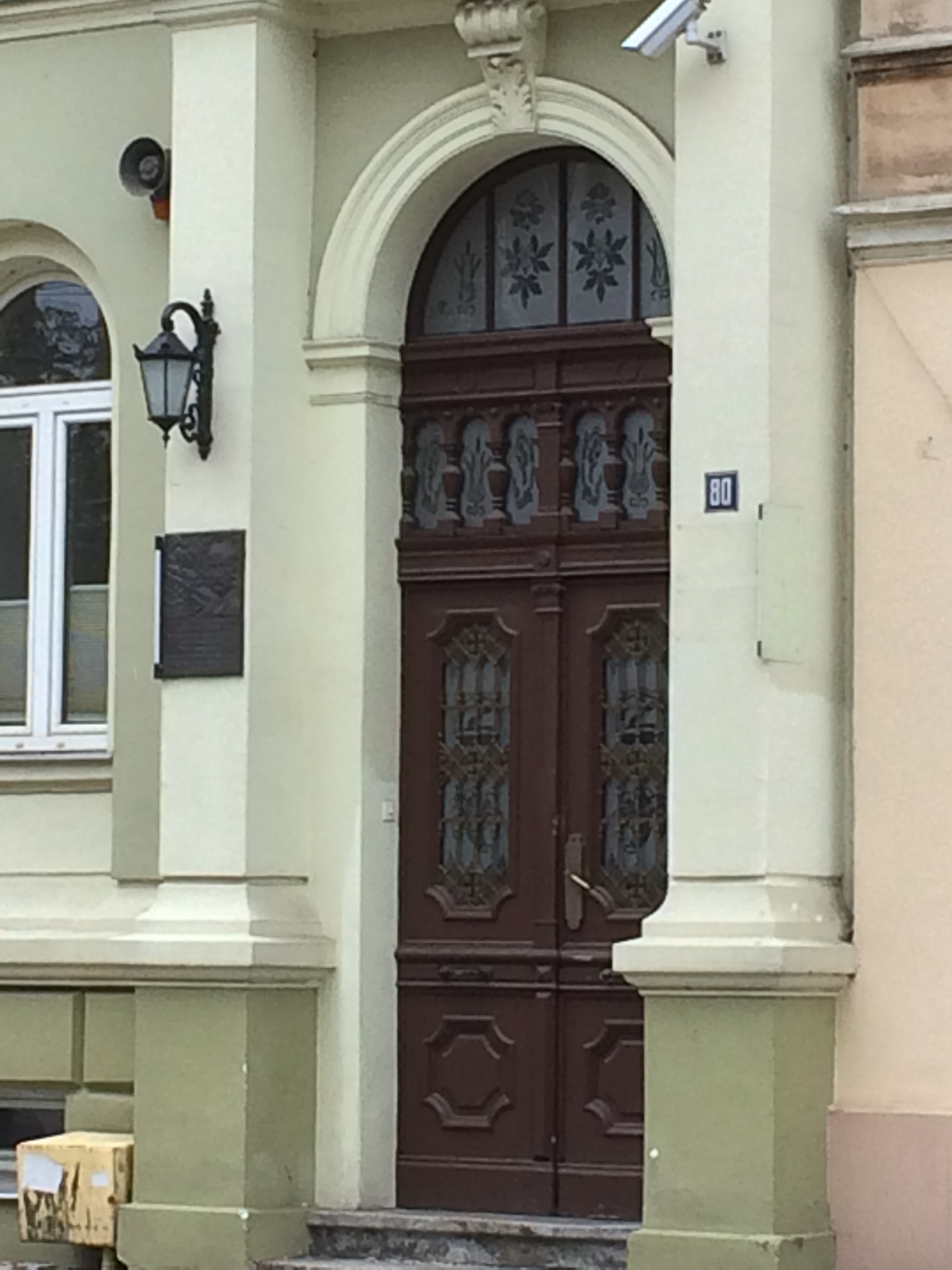
Detail of the gate

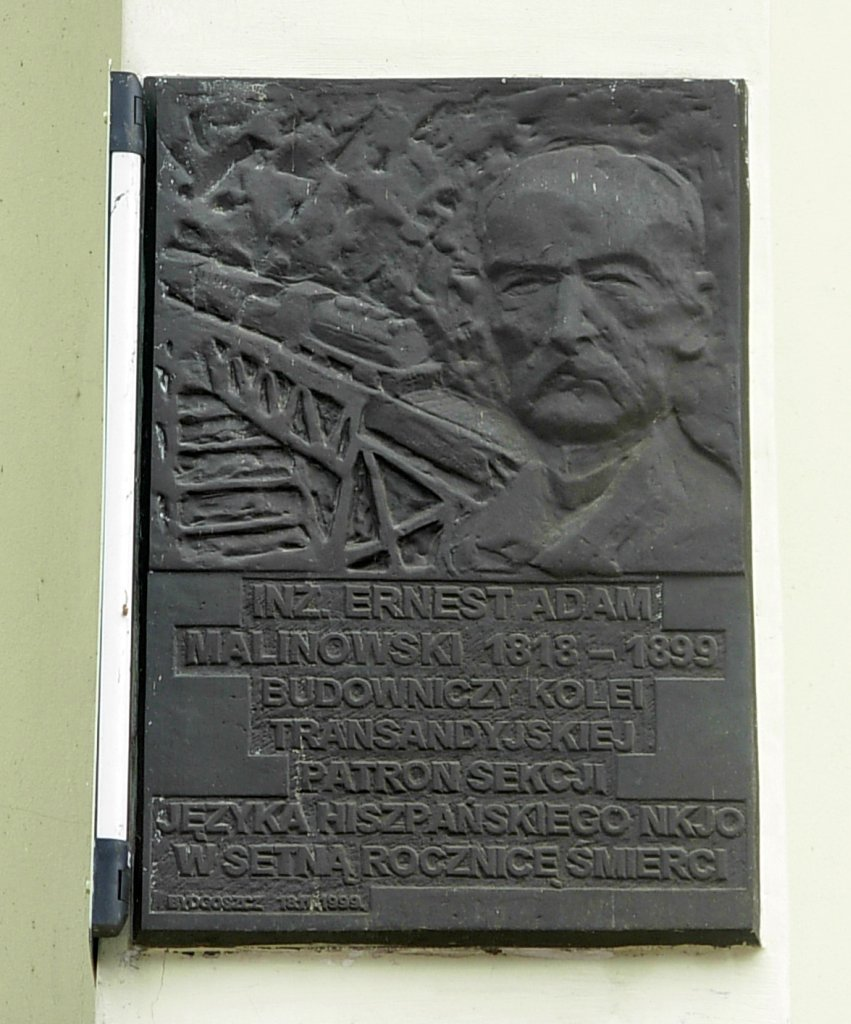
Plaque to Ernest Malinowski's memory.

=== Eltra tower at 81 ===
1964

Modern architecture

The tower building was erected to house the seat of the company "Eltra", founded in 1923 in Bydgoszcz. It is one of the oldest firms in the electrotechnical industry in Poland. In 1959, it produced the first Polish transistor radio "Eltra MOT-59". In 2003, it was established as a joint-stock company named "Elda-Eltra Elektrotechnika", belonging to the international concern Schneider Electric.

The 45 metres (148 ft) tall tower has been revamped in 2019–2020.

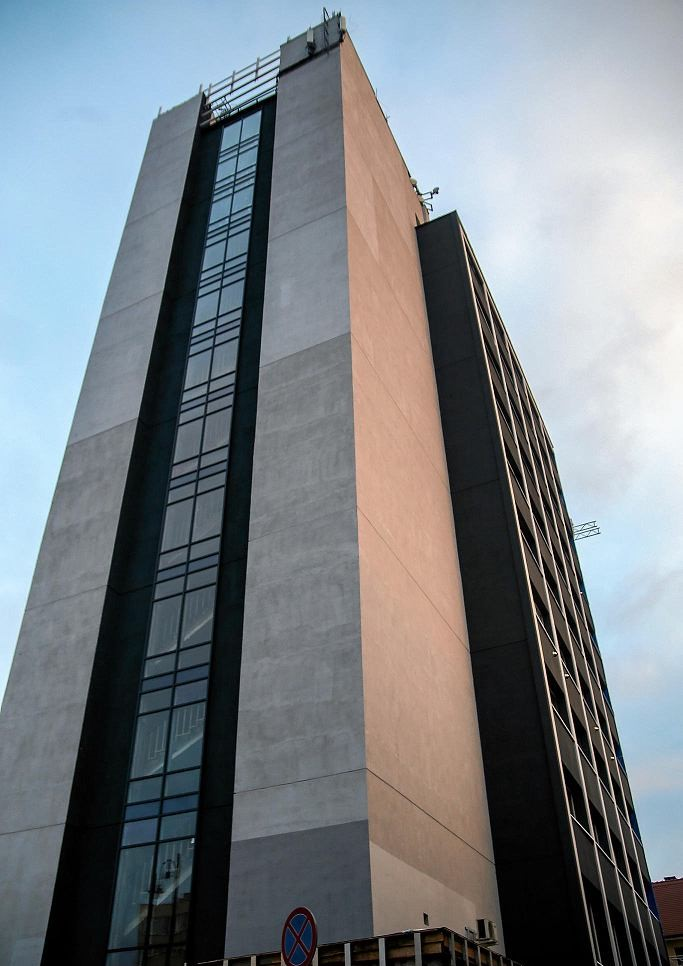
Renovated tower in 2021

=== Elementary school at 82 ===
1854-1855

Eclecticism

Earliest reference of the building at Bahnhofstraße 58 can be found in the address book of Bromberg in 1869, where it is described as "Bahnhofstraße Public school", German: Schule der Bahnhofstraße. It is then renamed "State school for boys and for girls" (German: Städtische Knaben- und Mädchenschule) in 1876. After World War I, the building kept its educational aims as Public school for boys Nr.1 Today, the edifice houses the Culture house for Youth Nr.4 (Polish: Młodzieżowy Dom Kultury nr 4).

The house shows early forms of Eclecticism, with references to German Historicism in the display of bricks chosen in two different colors.

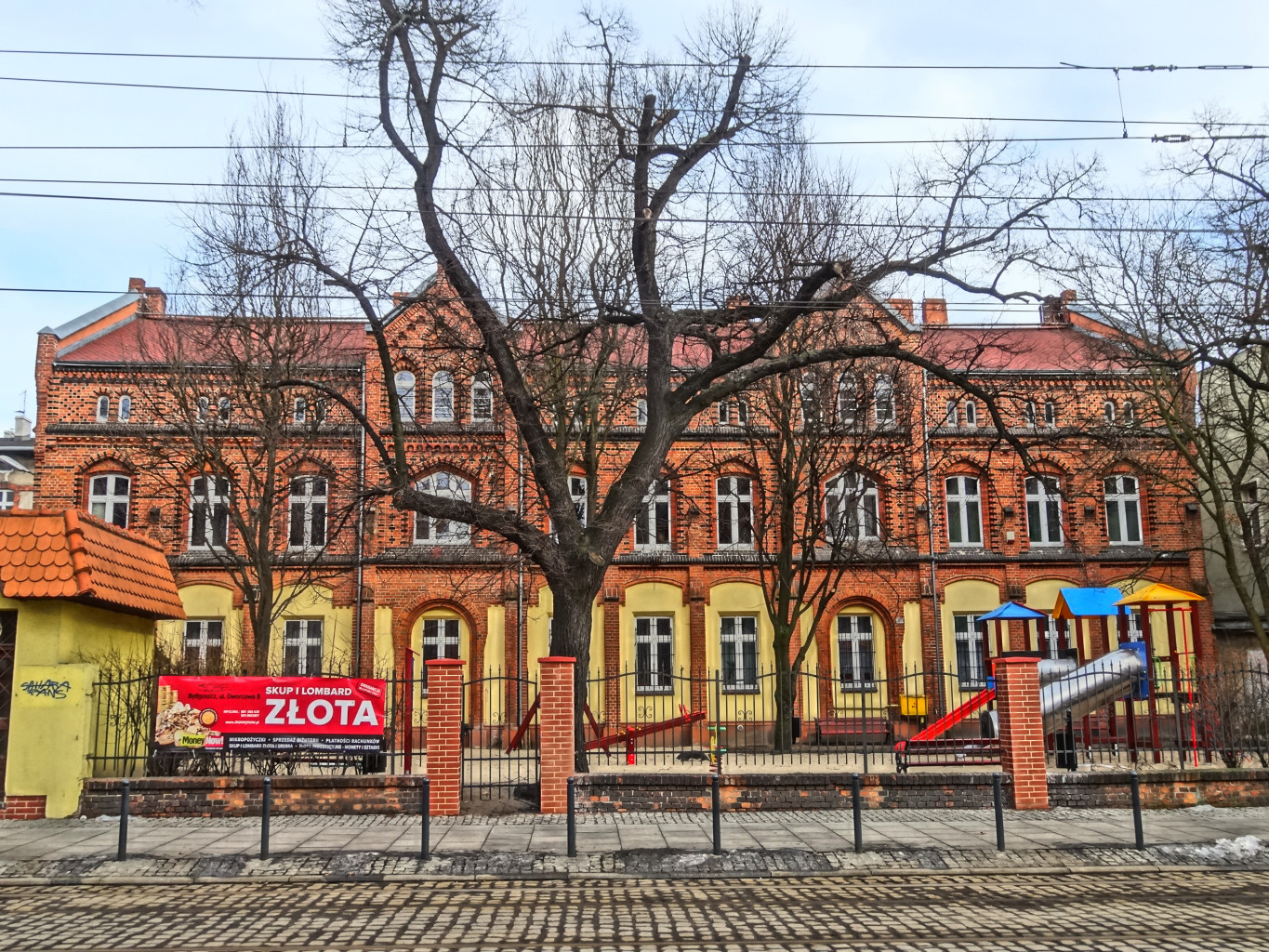
View from Dworcowa Street

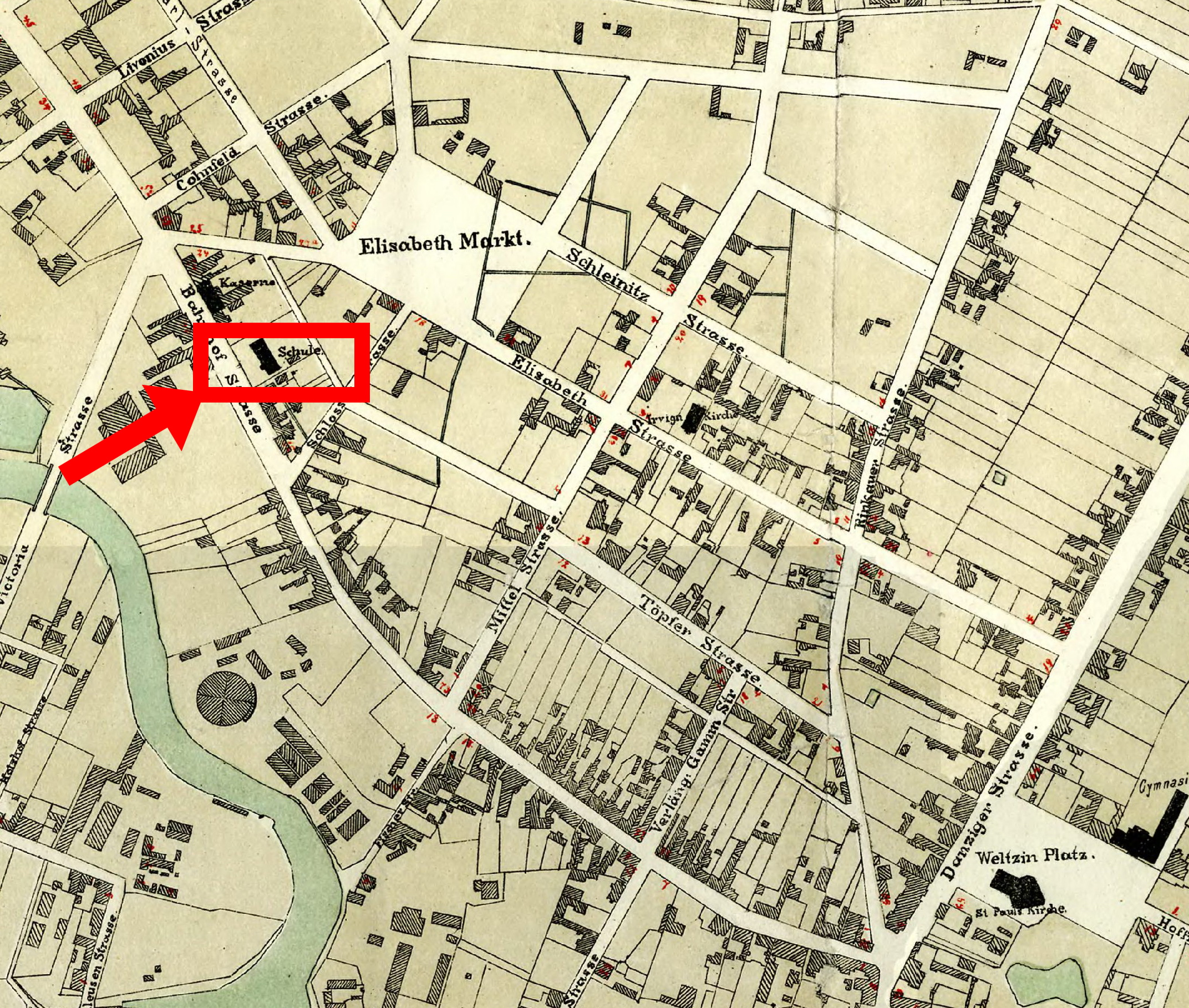
The school on an 1876 map

=== Tenement at 84 ===
1899

Eclecticism

Louis Bollmann, founder in 1898 of a brick factory, was the first owner of the tenement then located at Bahnhofstraße 57 until the 1910s.

The facade is well balanced, with two balconies on each side, with balustrades and wrought iron details. A very large balcony stands in the middle of the elevation, topped by a full row of balusters on the roof. The gate frame is ornamented with columns and a pediment where stands a large sculpture of a sitting crowned lion, holding a coat of arms with shields.

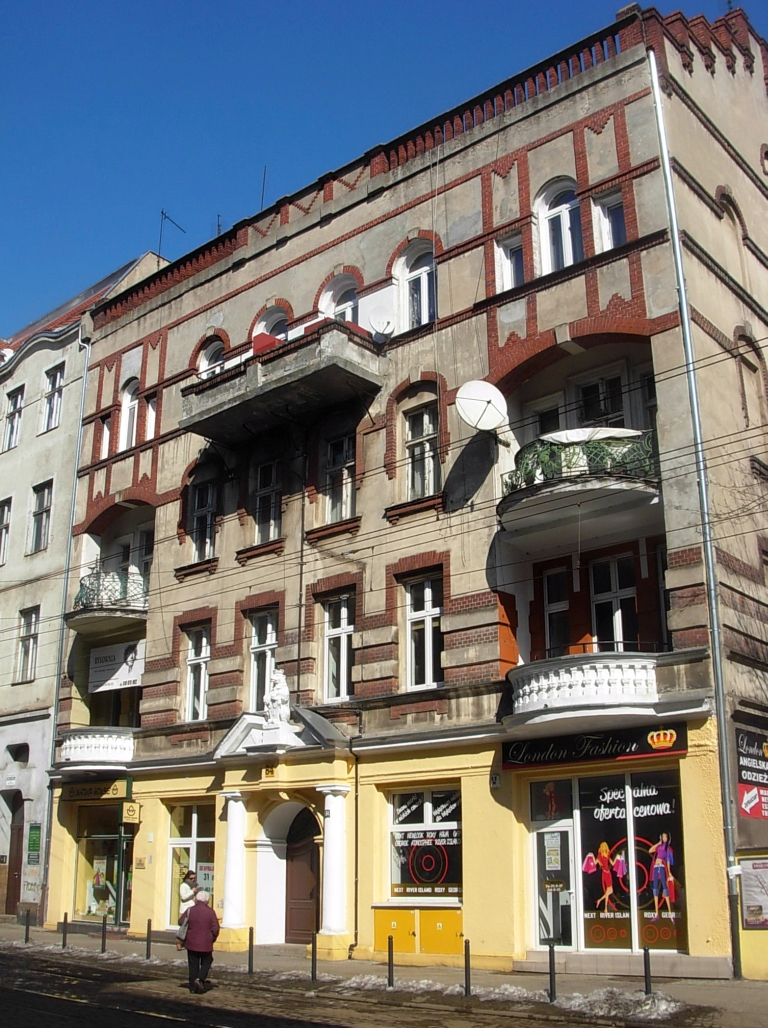
Facade on Dworcowa Street

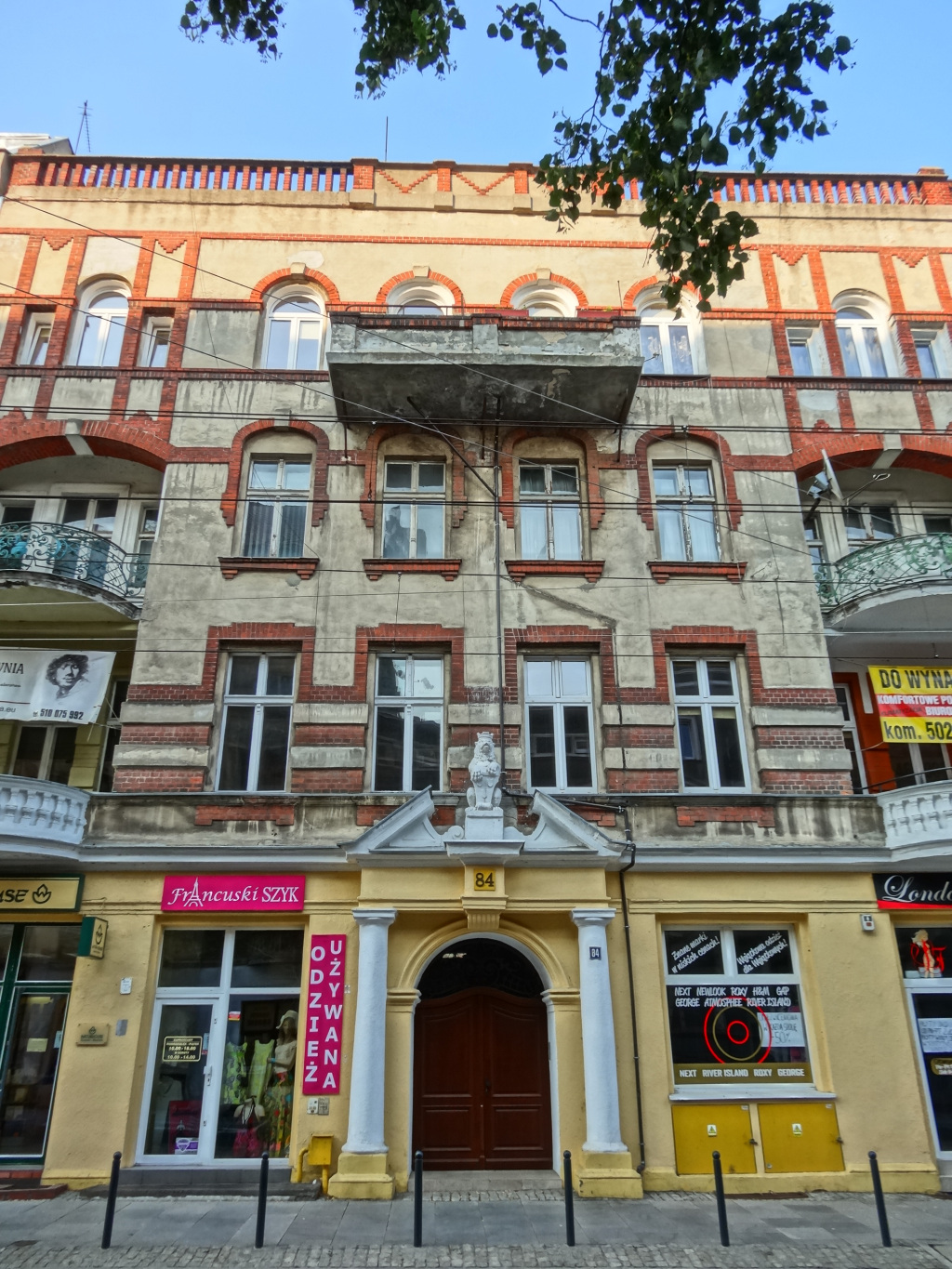
Main elevation detail

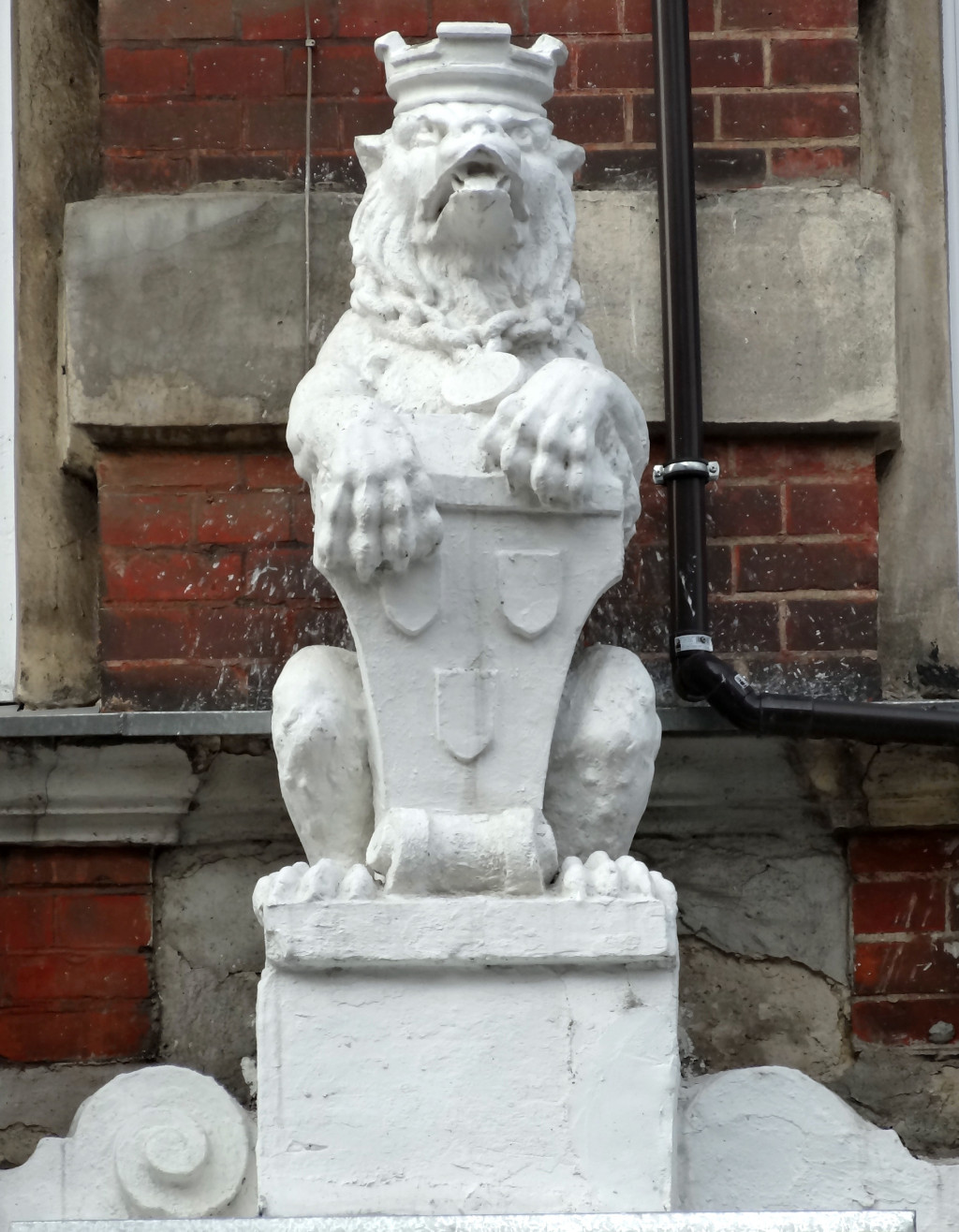
Detail of the entry pediment

=== Hotel Centralny at 85, corner with Unii Lubelskiej street ===
1875–1876, by Gustaw Weihe

Eclecticism

F.F.A.H. Brennecke, a railway operation controleur, is the first registered owner of the house at Bahnhofstraße 37. In 1900, the edifice became the Hotel Victoria and Hotel "Viktoria" in 1920, run by Jan Draheim. It is still a hotel today, "Hotel Centralny".

The architecture of this corner house is typical of the last quarter of the 19th century: a two-storey (plus attic) tenement, with few decoration on the outside, except a frieze running beneath the gable, some shed dormers, and a nicely adorned bay window on the corner. Quite noticeable is the entry in the corner, flanked by two columns.

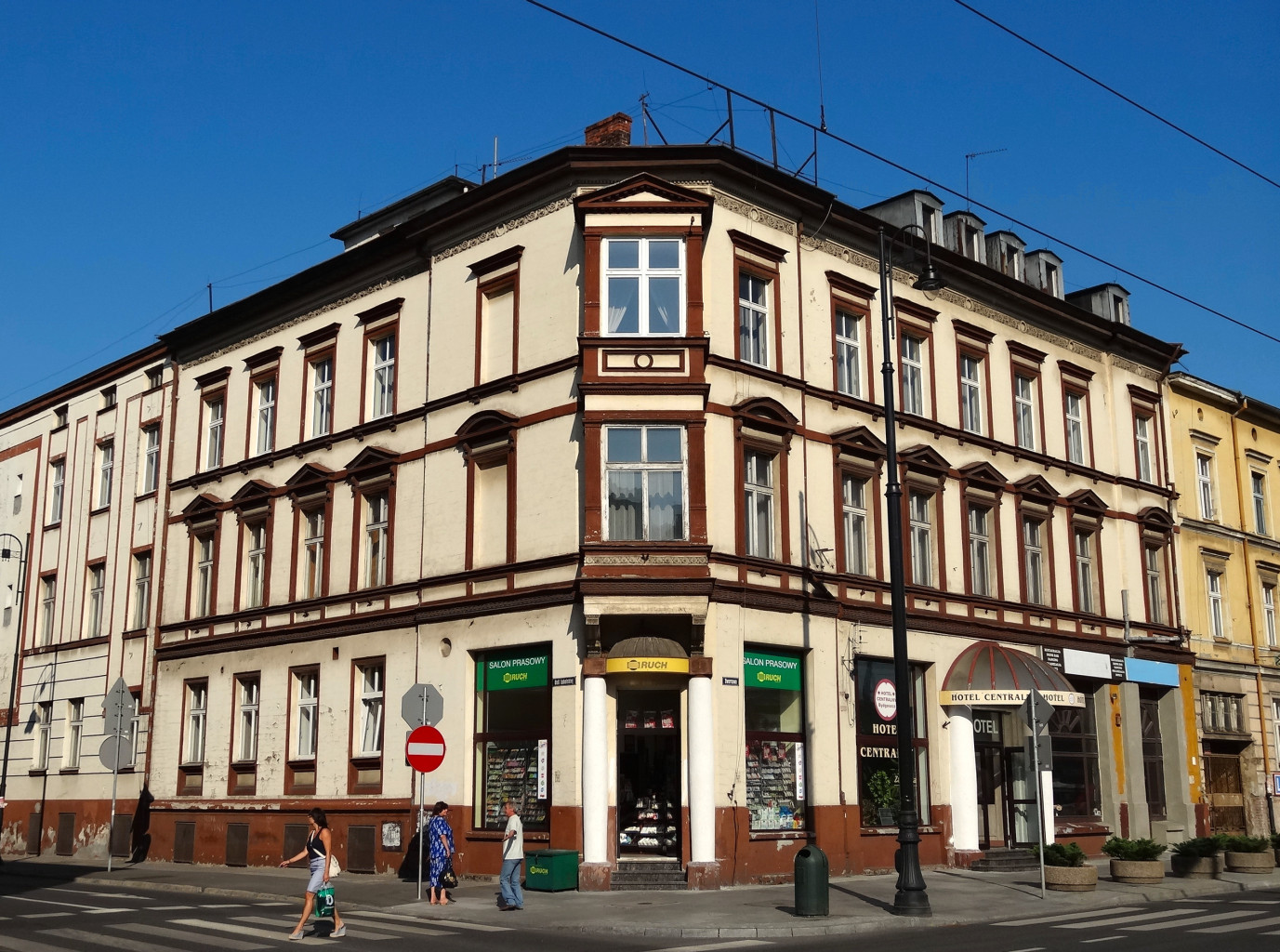
View from Dworcowa Street

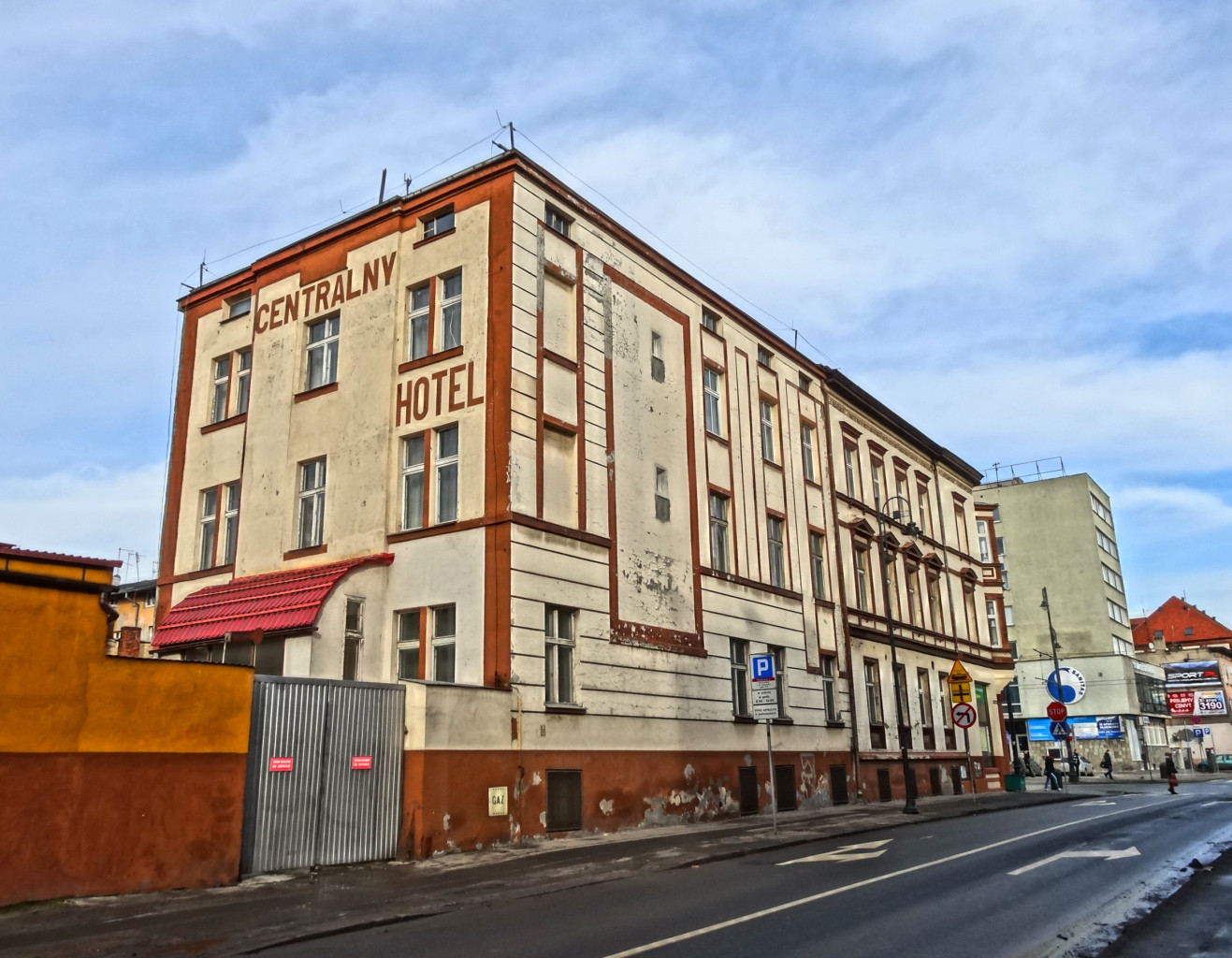
View from Unii Lubelskiej street

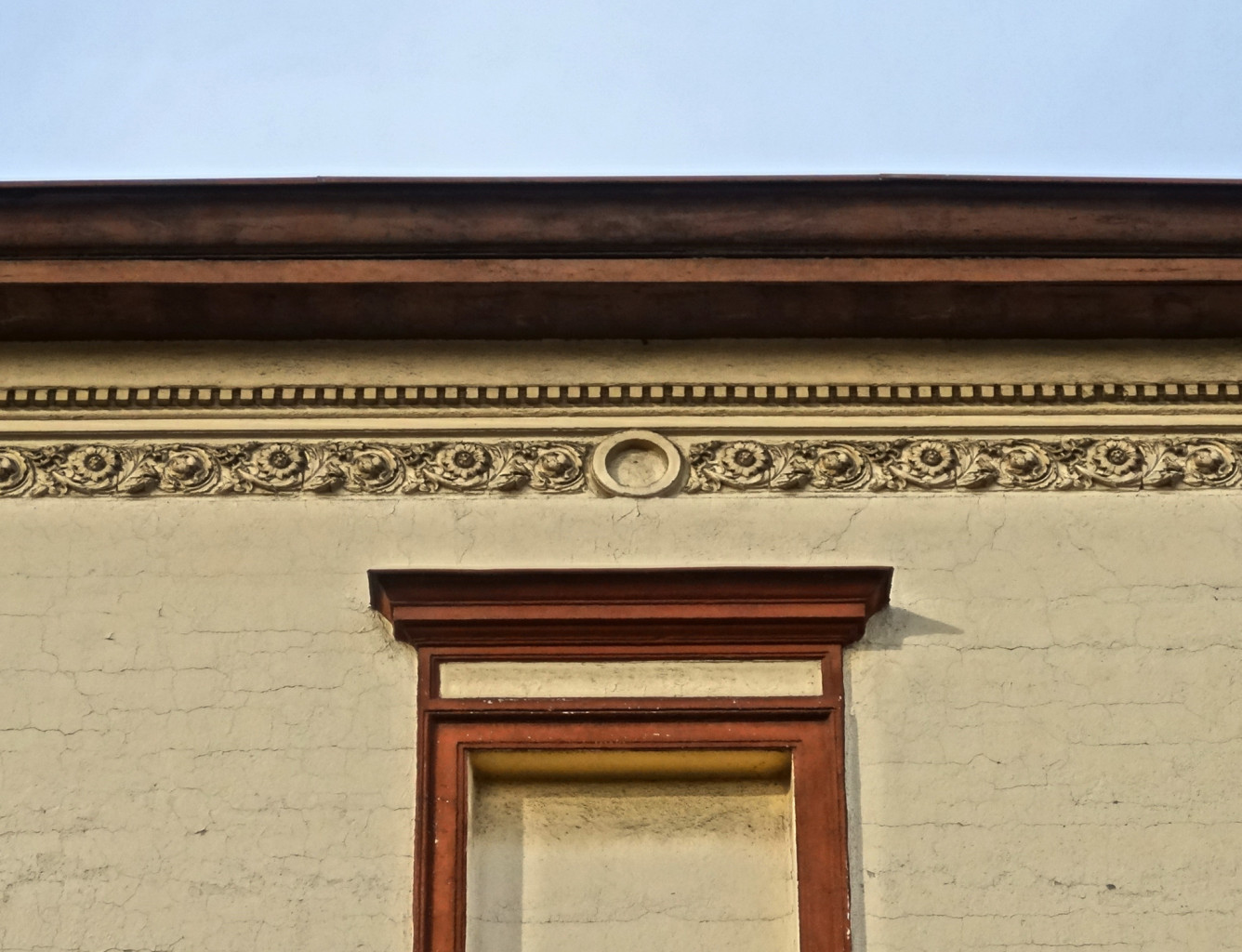
Frieze detail

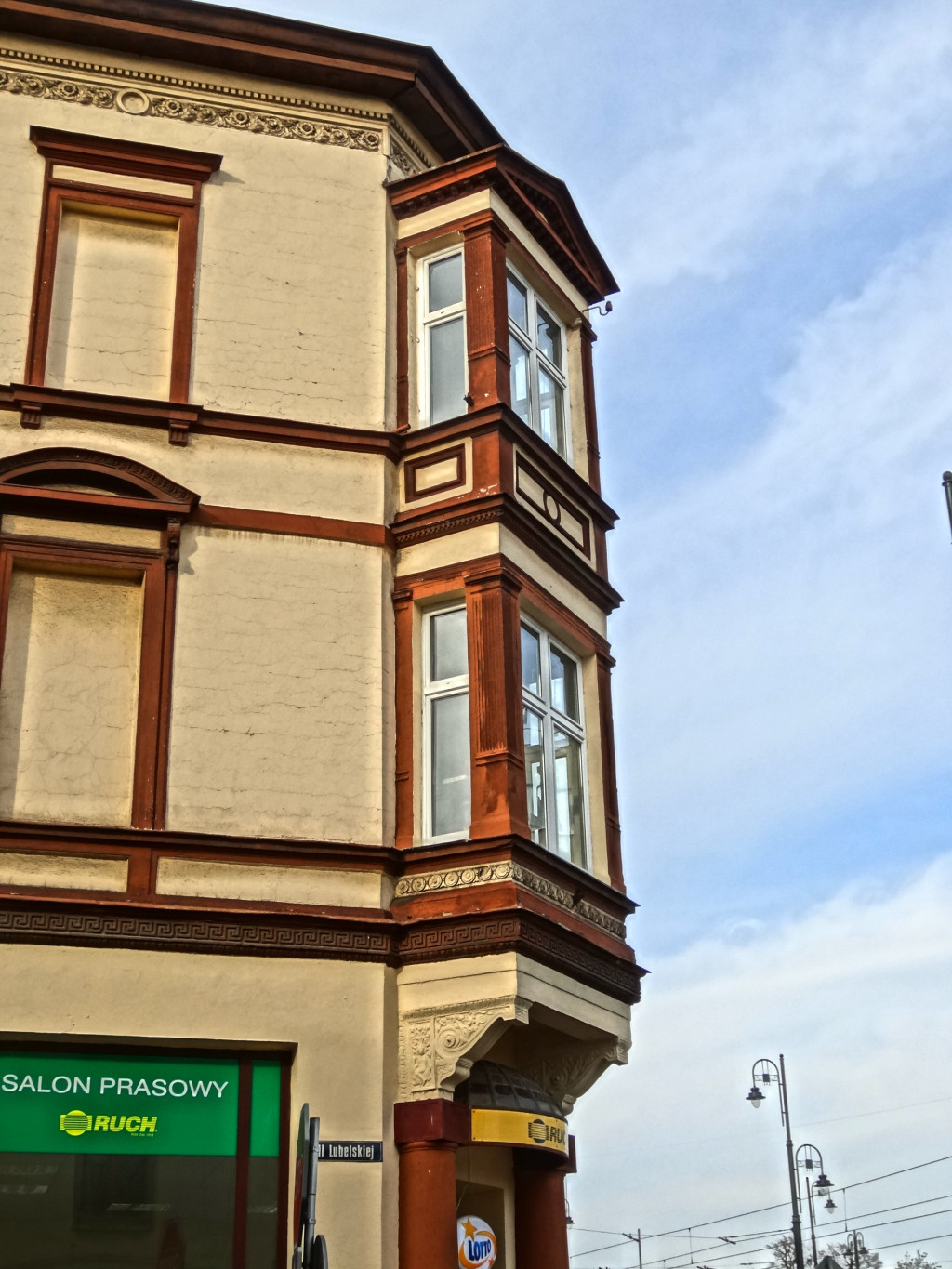
Detail of the corner bay window

=== Heinrich Kirsch tenement, at 86 ===
1904, by Rudolf Kern

Secession

Heinrich Kirsch was the owner of the newly commissioned house to Rudolf Kern at Bahnhofstraße 56. He lived there until World War I. At the same time, the architect has been building his own house at 1 Adam Mickiewicz Alley. The building underwent a thorough renovation in 2020.

The main elevation, now refurbished, reveals Art Nouveau inclinations: curved shapes of the gable, portals and transom emphasize the Secession inspiration of Rudolf Kern. In addition, the facade strikes by its huge bay window, topped by a balcony.

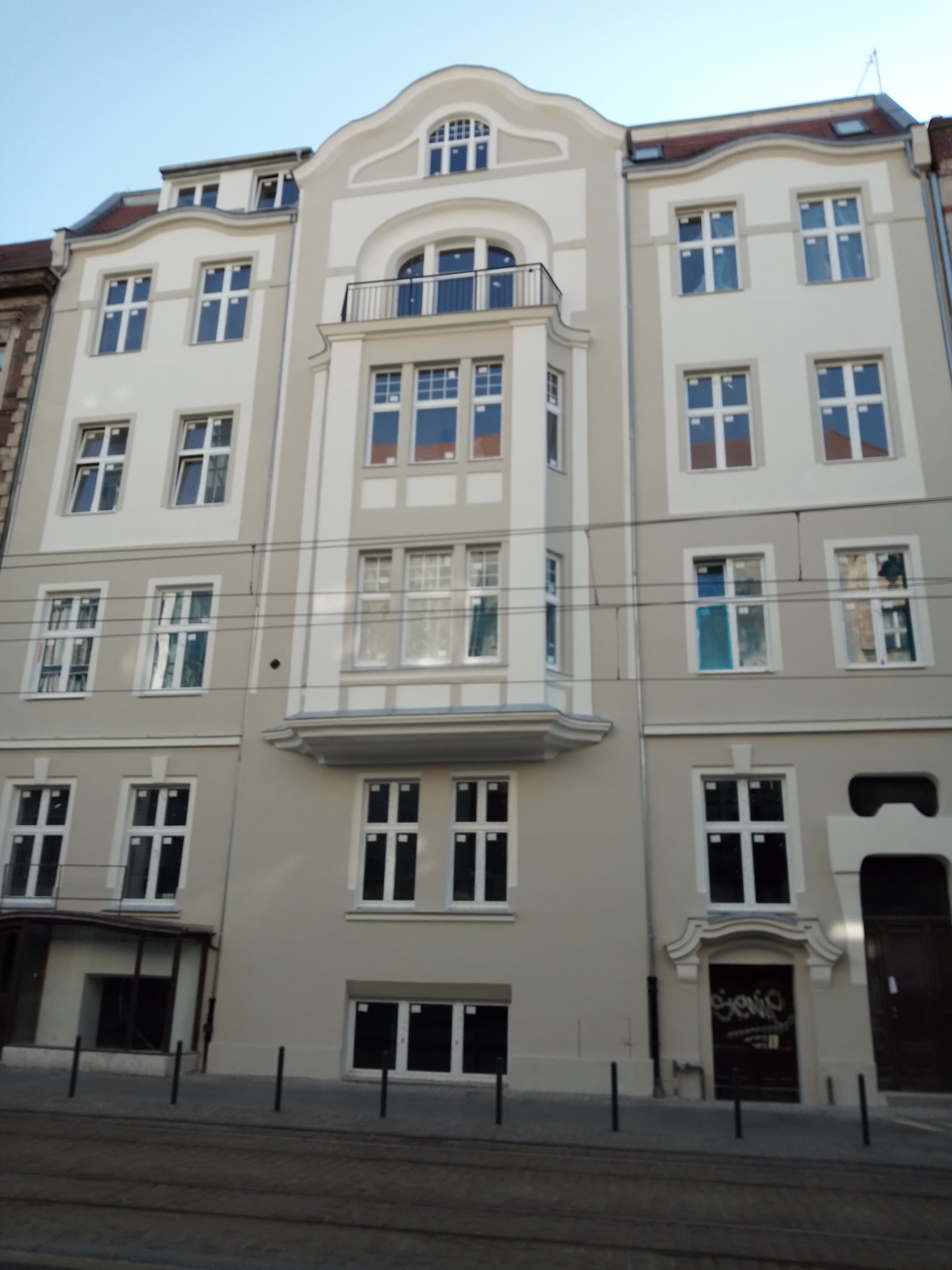
Facade at Nr.86 after renovation

=== Tenement at 87 ===
1864-1870

Eclecticism

The tenement at then Bahnhofstraße 38, even though conceived as a habitation house at its inception in 1876, soon turned to house a hotel: Heise's Hotel in 1876, Hoffman's Hotel in 1884 then Gelhorn's Hotel from 1887 to 1939, period from which the actual building dates back to. After WWII, the building was the local seat of the United People's Party (Polish: Zjednoczone Stronnictwo Ludowe, ZSL). On March 16, 1981, it was occupied by farm workers from the trade union "Solidarity" (Polish: Solidarność).

The facade reflects Neo-Renaissance elements, with its bared wall and minimal window decoration. One can notice the original transom above the vehicle entry, on the left of the elevation.

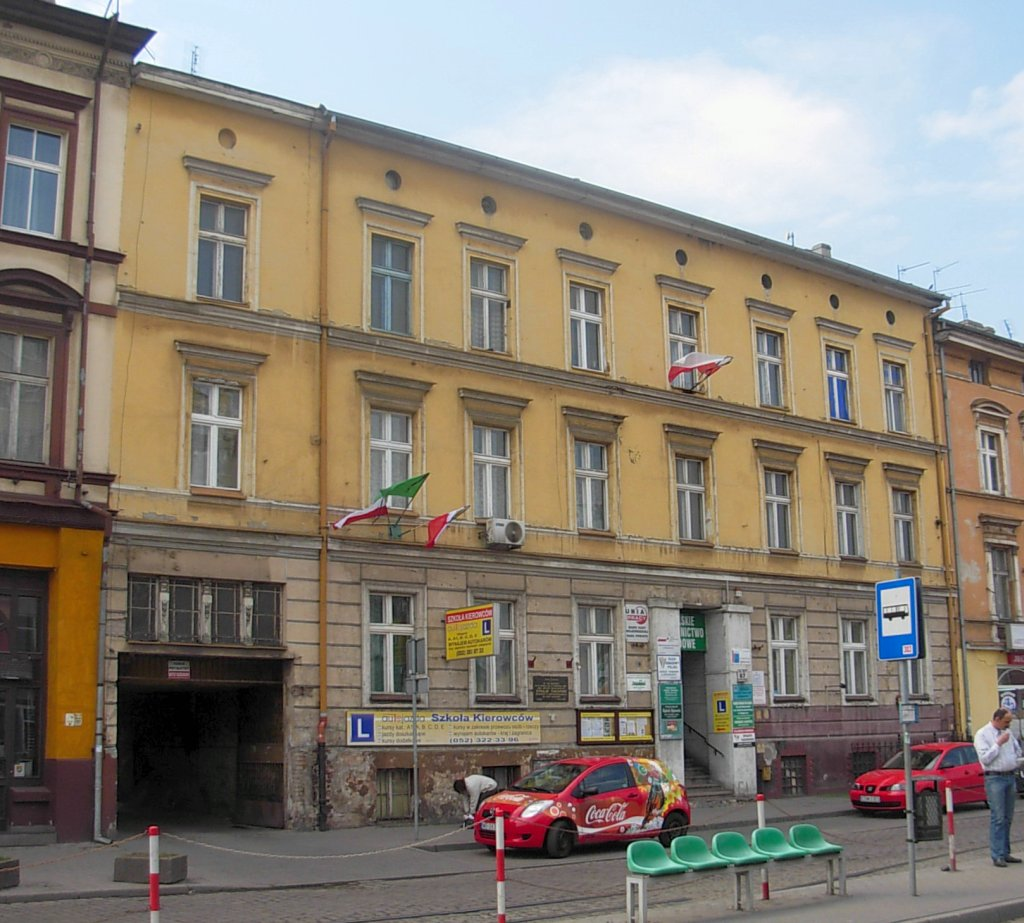
Facade on Dworcowa Street

=== Tenement at 88 ===
1899

Neo-Renaissance

A restaurateur at then Bahnhofstraße 55, Emil Geste, sold in 1899 the tenement to Clara and Reinhold Rosente, wine and delicatessen merchands, who owned already the adjoining house at Nr.54 (corner with Śniadecki Street).

The facade reflects nicely Neo-Renaissance style: symmetry of the ensemble (balconies disposition, gates locations), specific decoration of openings per level (pediments with Acanthus or bare). It incorporates somehow Neo-Baroque elements, for instance in the wrought iron balustrade of balconies, or the top curved gable. Worth noticeable is the door gate, delicately adorned, as well as the Hermes figure overlooking the entry. A thorough renovation was performed in 2025.

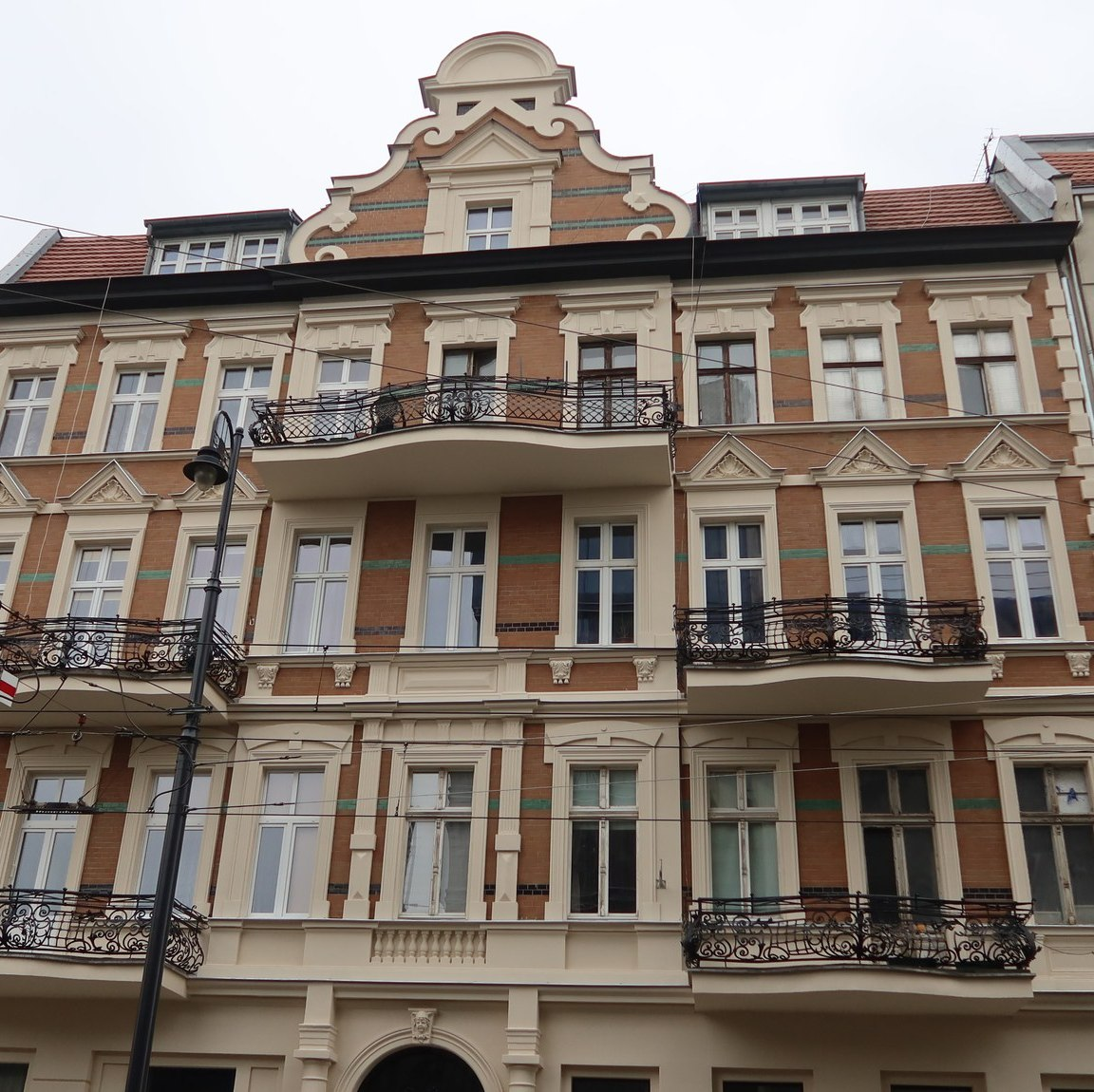
Restored facade

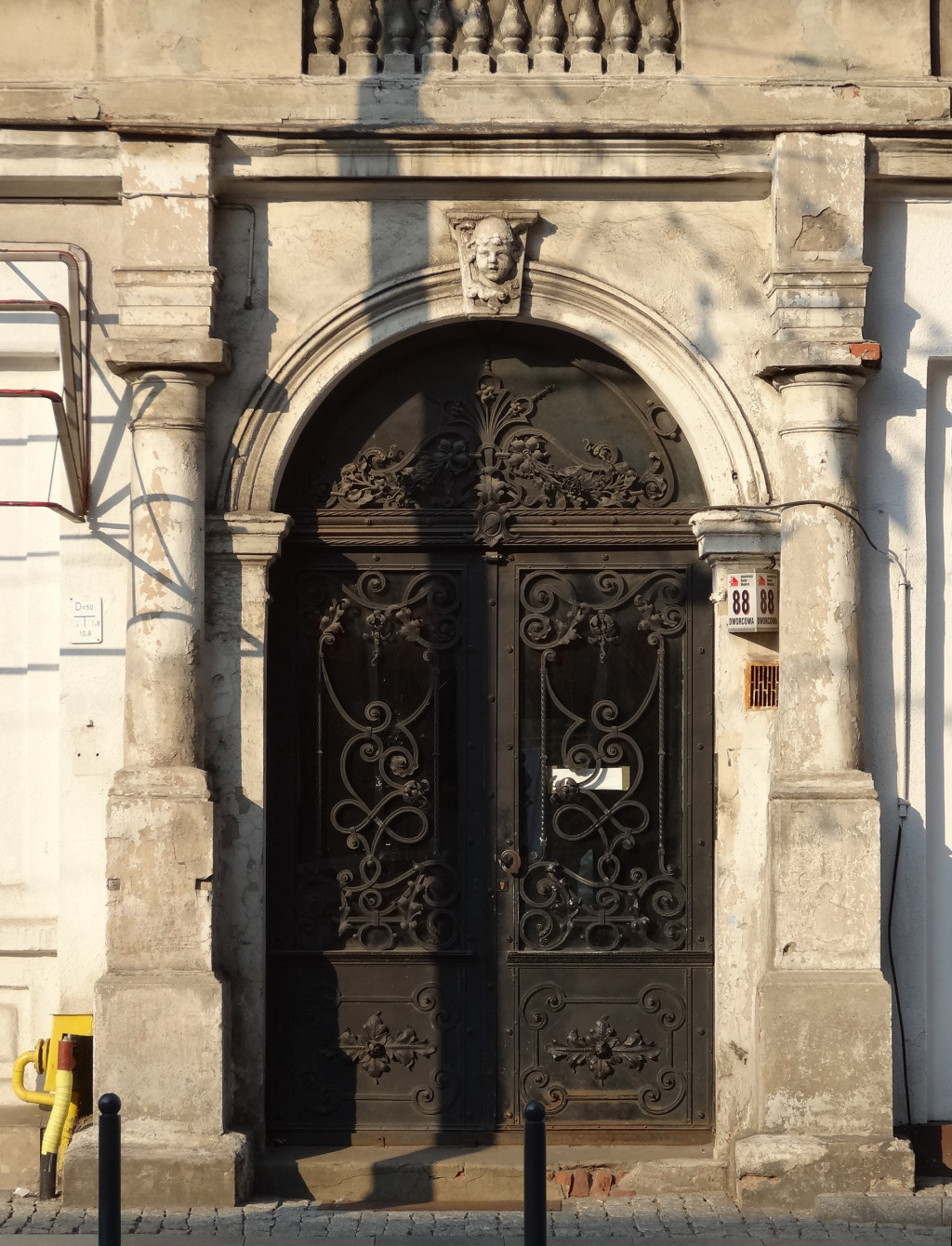
Gate detail

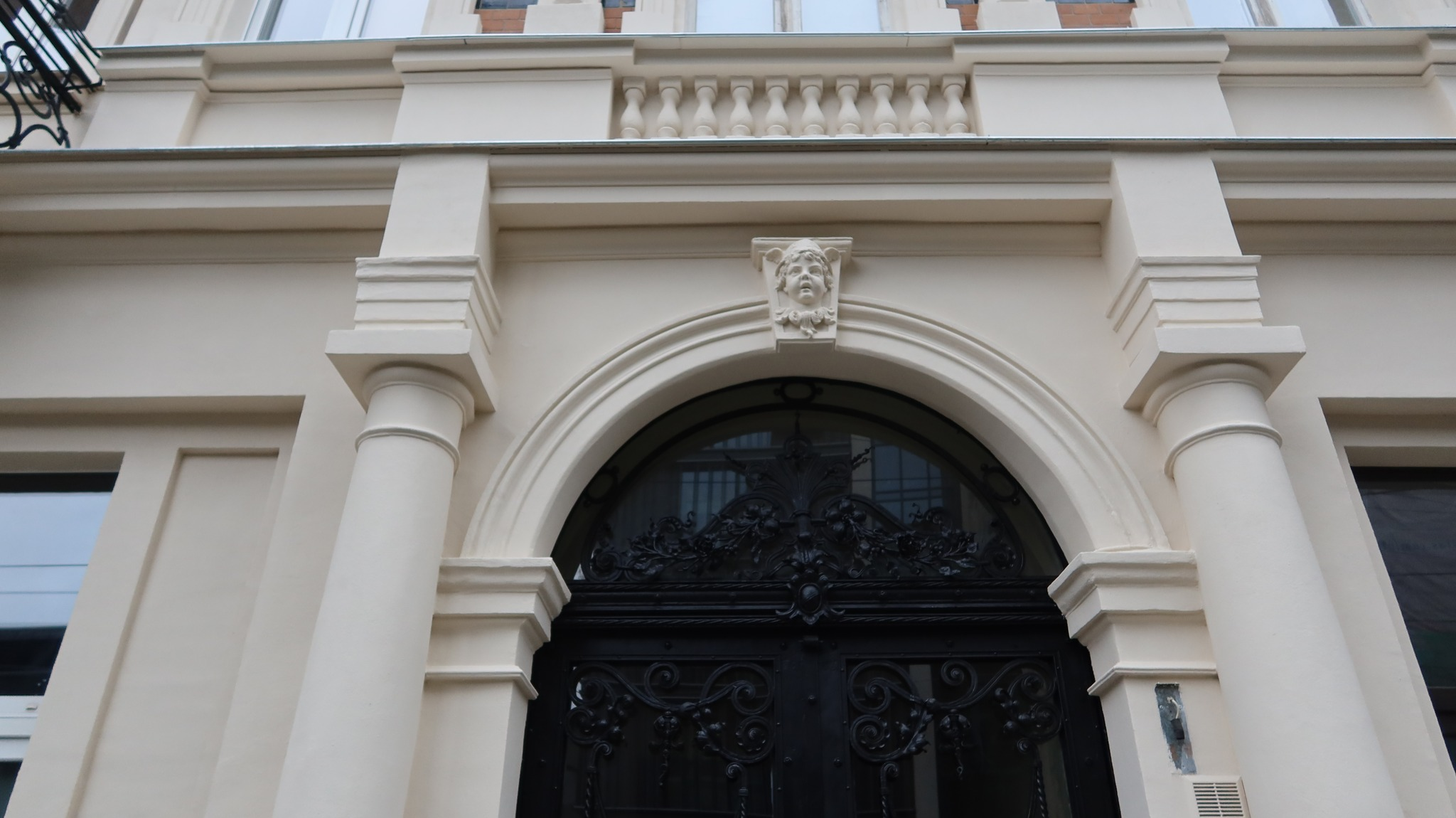
Ornamentation detail

=== Tenement at 89, corner with Zygmunt August Street ===
1870

Eclecticism

Friedrich Kalau, mail office director, was the first landlord of house at then Bahnhofstraße 39. The year after, the building became a hotel, Hotel du Nord. Its name changes several times, "Riller's Hotel" in 1875 and "Gelhorn's Hotel" in 1898 run by Anna and Max Scheidling, then by Johannes Bohlmann from the 1910s until World War II.

The facade mirrors neighbouring one at Nr.87, but for its larger middle balustrade and the position of the entry gate.

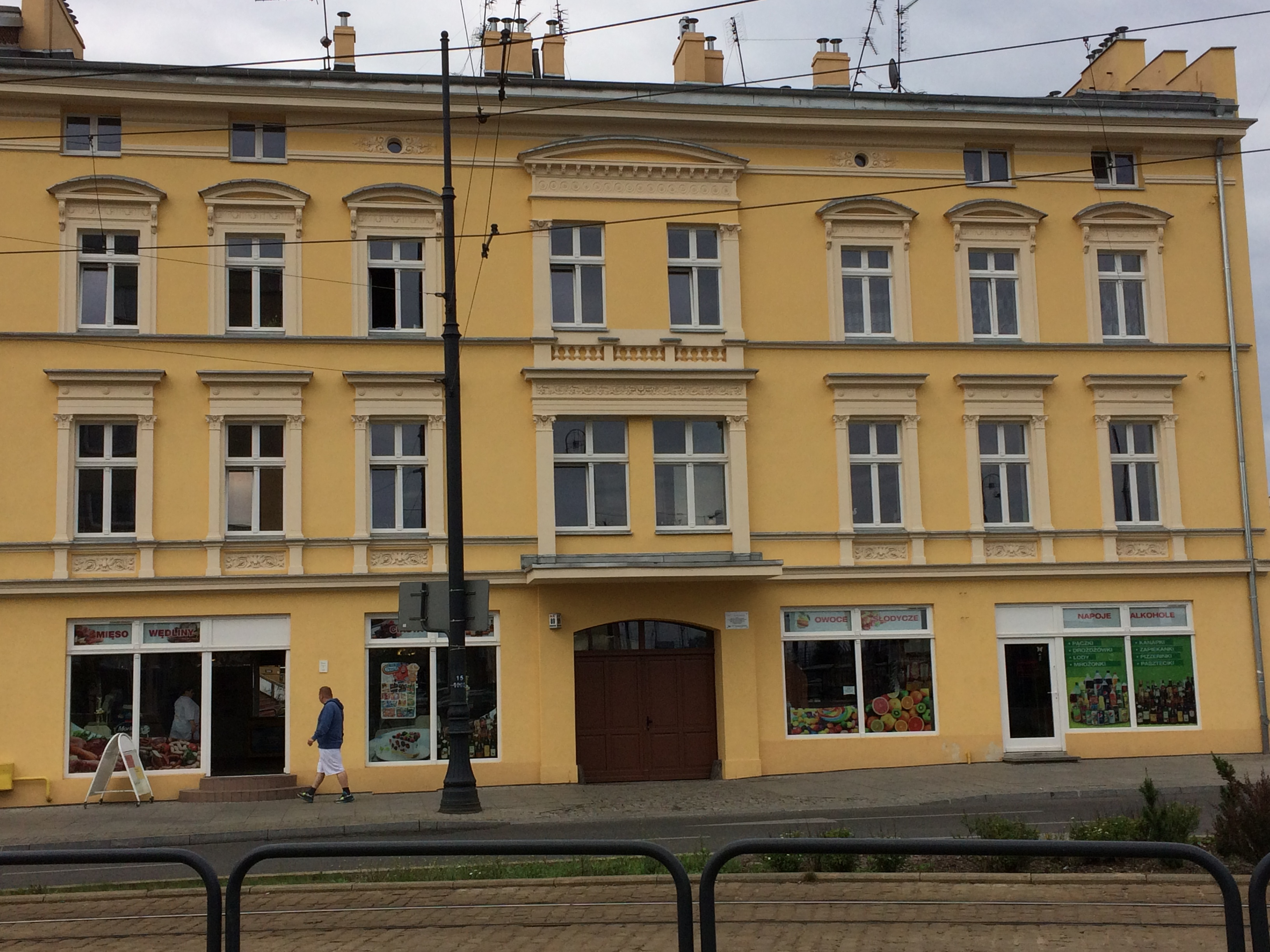
Facade on Dworcowa Street

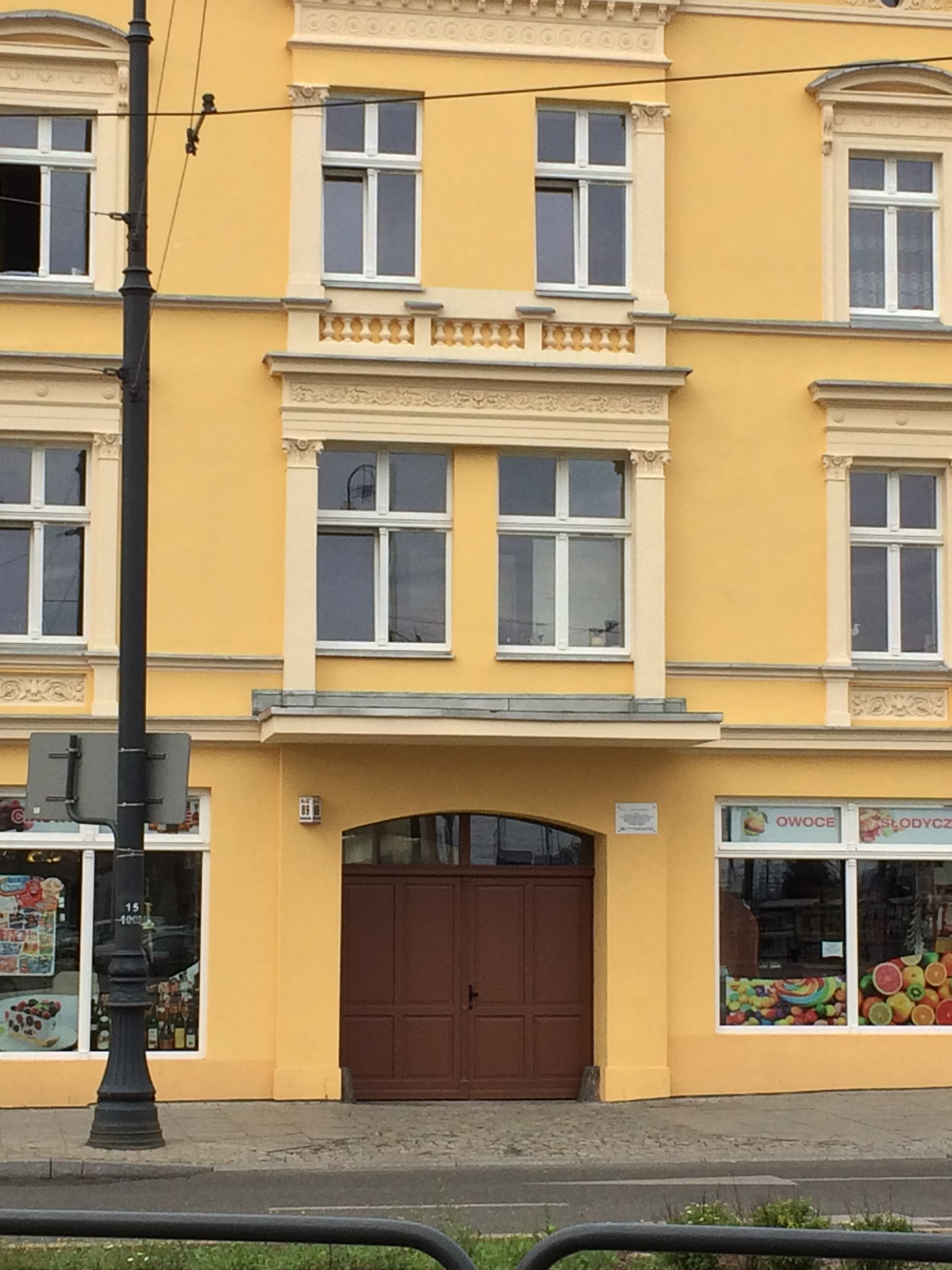
Main gate and bay window

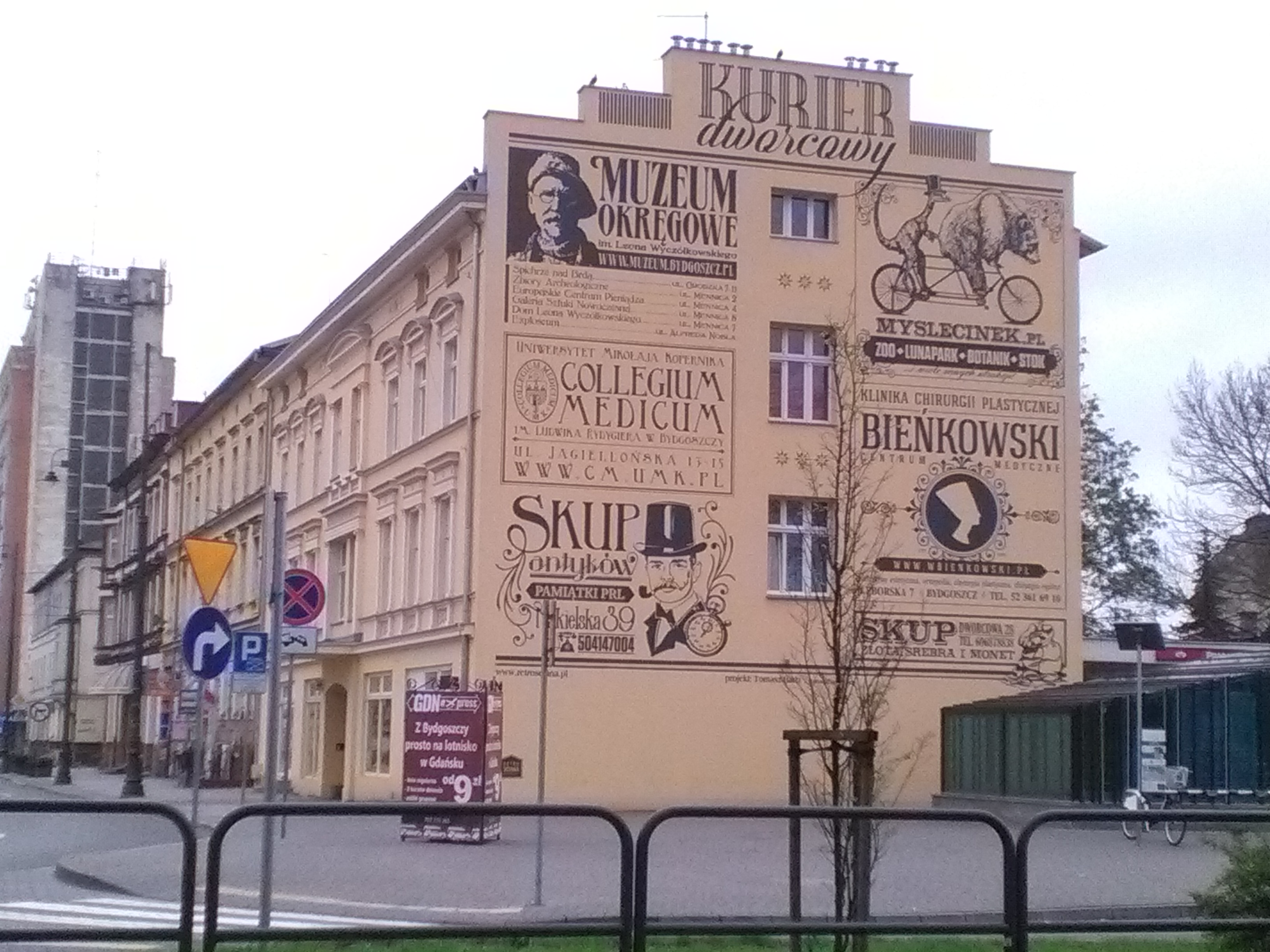
Old style advertising on building's side

=== Hotel Brda at 94 ===
1854 & 1972

Functionalism

Before the Brda hotel (1972), several other hotel have been standing there: Heise’s Hotel (1889), Hotel zur Neue Stadt (1891) and Hotel Nowe Miasto (1920–1922).

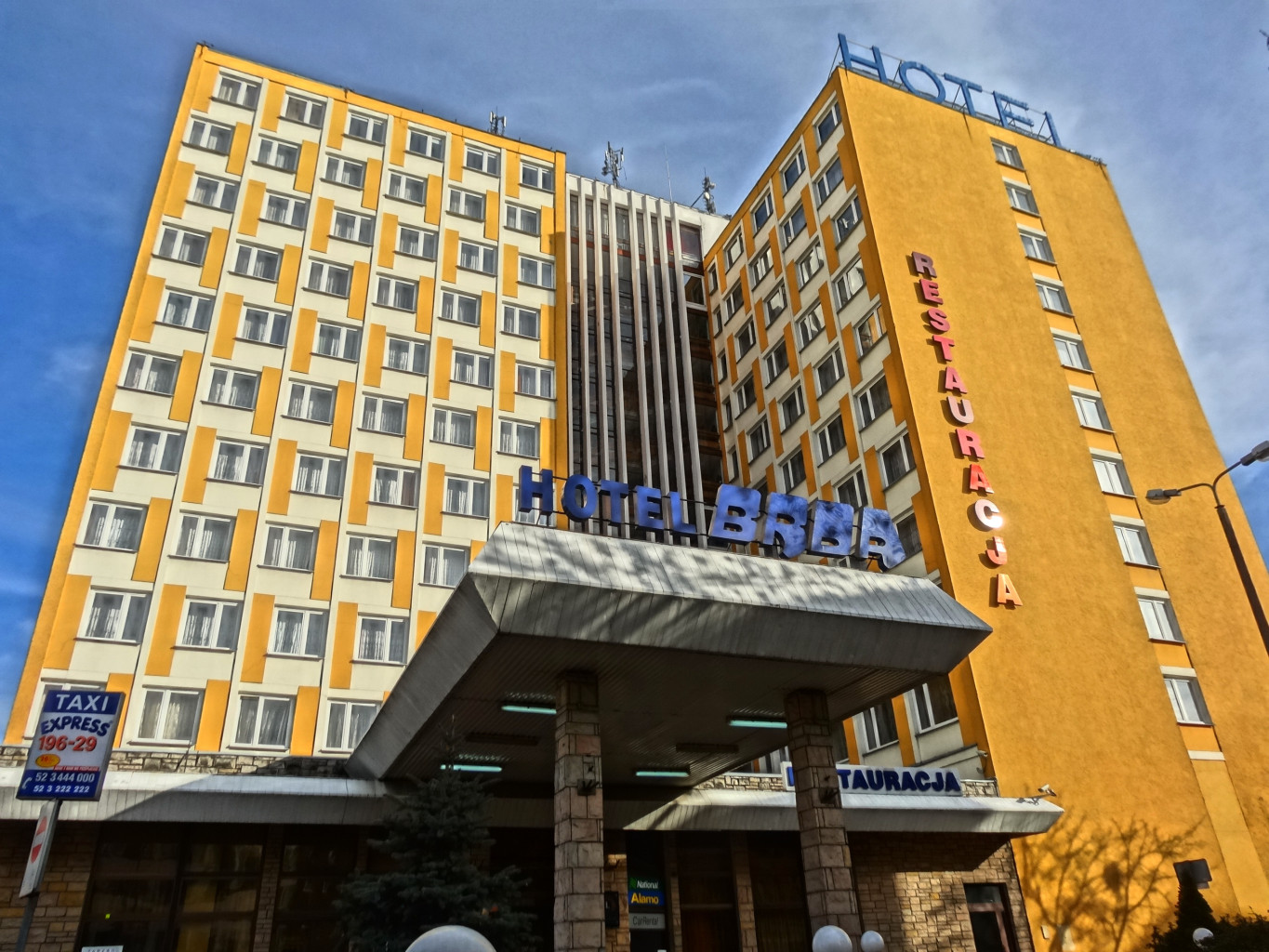
Facade on Dworcowa Street

=== Tenement at 98 ===
1894

Neo-Renaissance

The tenement at Bahnhofstraße 50 was owned by Albin Cohnfeld, a rentier, who lived at 77 Dworcowa Street. He also owned the adjoining house at Nr.100. Between 1894 and 1937, a Post Office (German: Postamt) has been standing there.

The facade has a rich decoration, including:

- On the ground floor, bossages and mascarons above each window;
- On the second floor, a wrought iron balcony.

On both levels, opening are topped by pediments. Most remarkable is the delicate bay window prolonged by a loggia with columns on the second floor, capped by a Tented roof steeple.

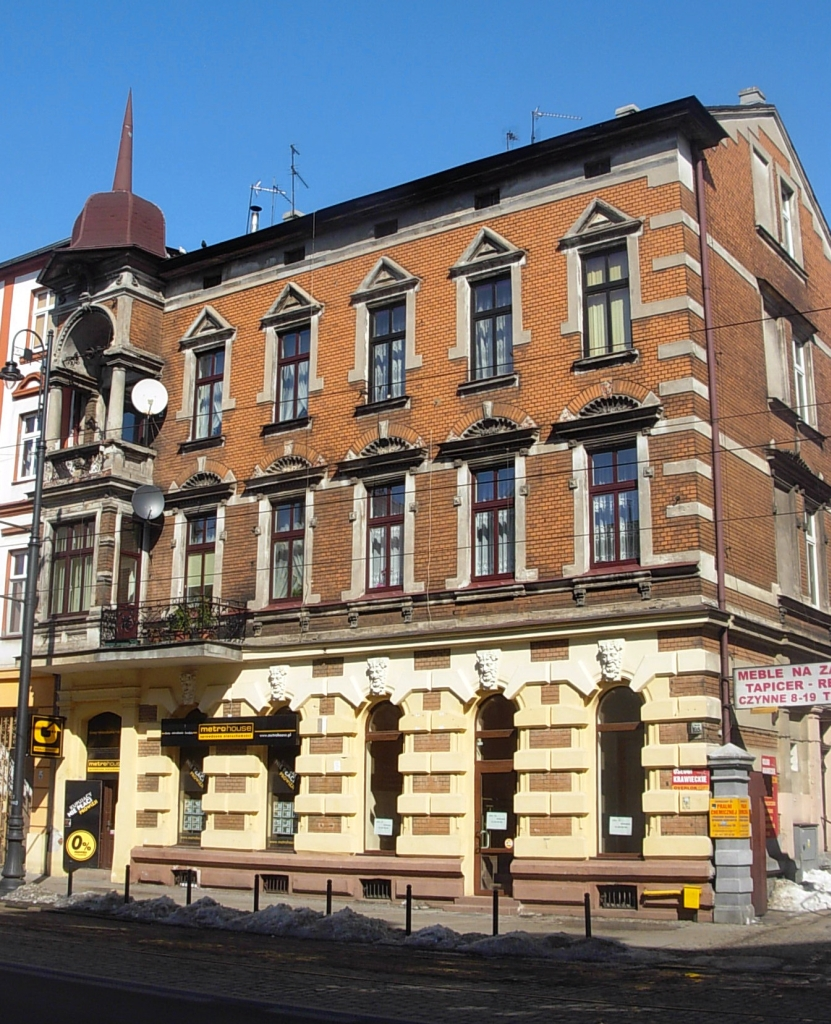
Facade on Dworcowa Street

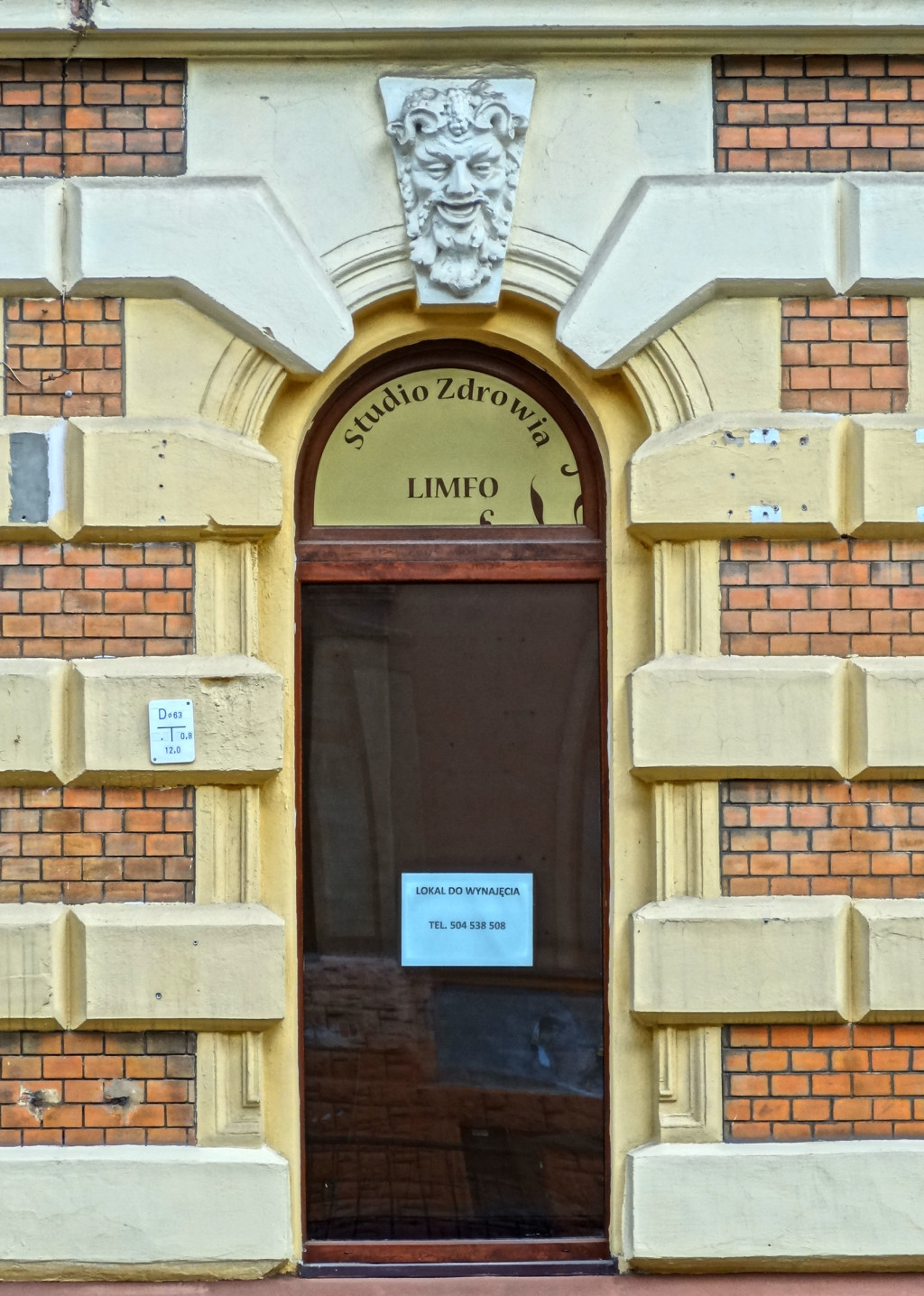
Gate detail

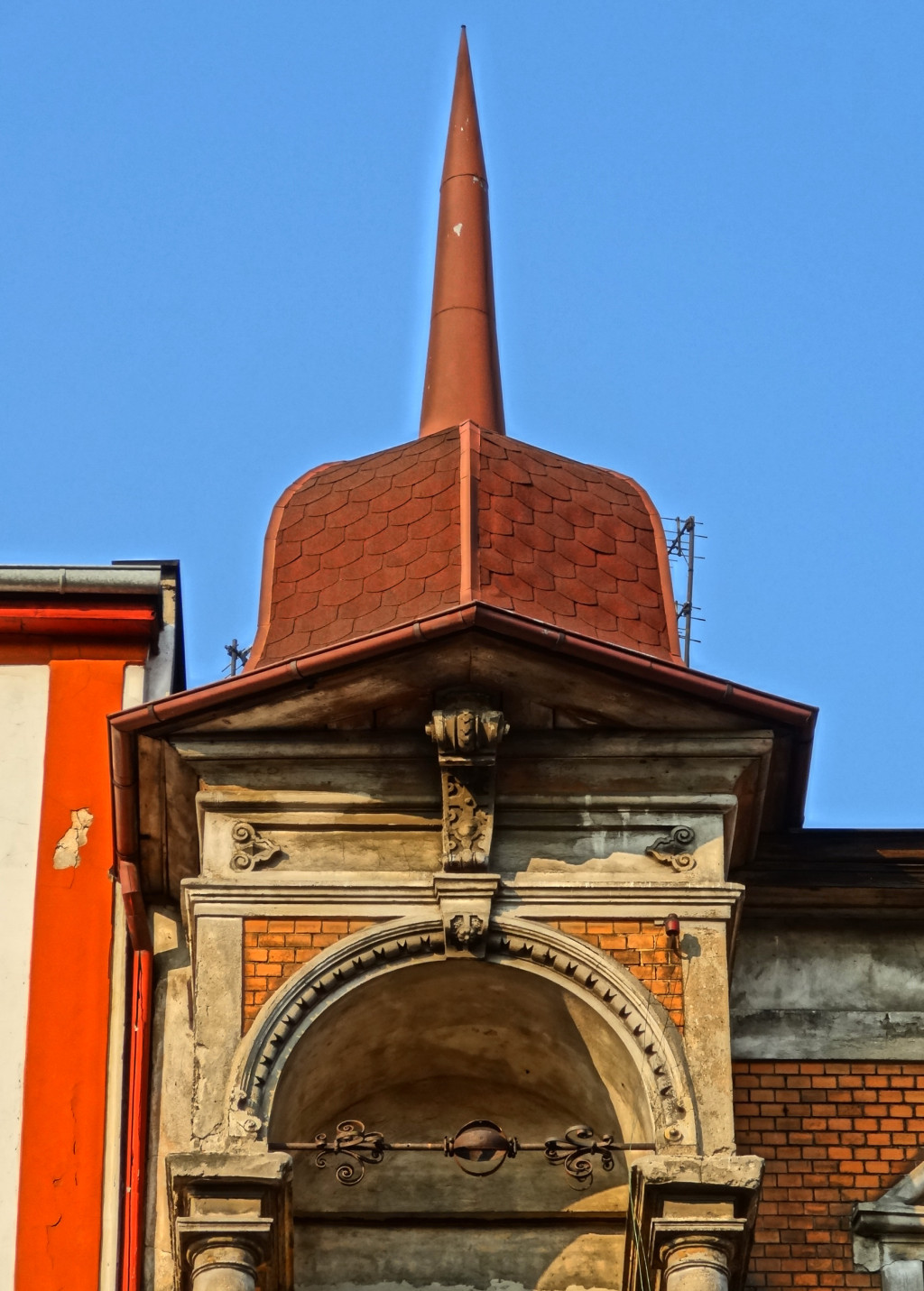
Detail of the steeple

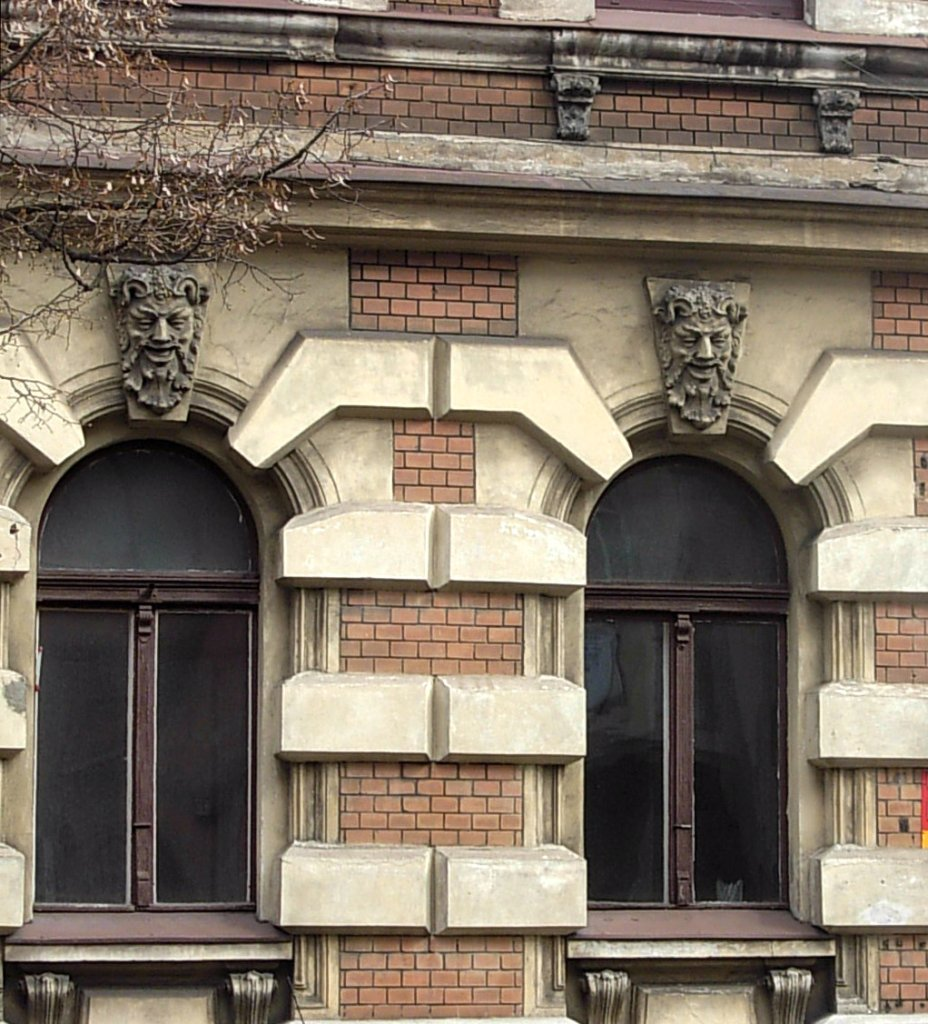
Facade decoration

=== Tenement at 100, corner with Sobieskiego street ===
1870, rebuilt in 1885, by Józef Święcicki and Anton Hoffmann

Eclecticism

House at then Bahnhofstraße 49, together with the one at Bahnhofstraße 50 (98 Dworcowa), have been owned since the 1870s by Albin Cohnfeld, a rentier, who lived at 77 Dworcowa Street. From 1877 to 1886, the building housed an hotel, Hotel St. Petersburg, run by Louis Jacobowski between 1877 and 1886. From 1913 to 1918, the tenement housed an auxiliary boy school (German: Hilfsschule), subsidiary to the "Johannischule" located at 20 Świętojańska street.

The eclectic styled facade has lost almost all of its features with time. Few pediments on second floor windows and a wrought iron entry grille are left.

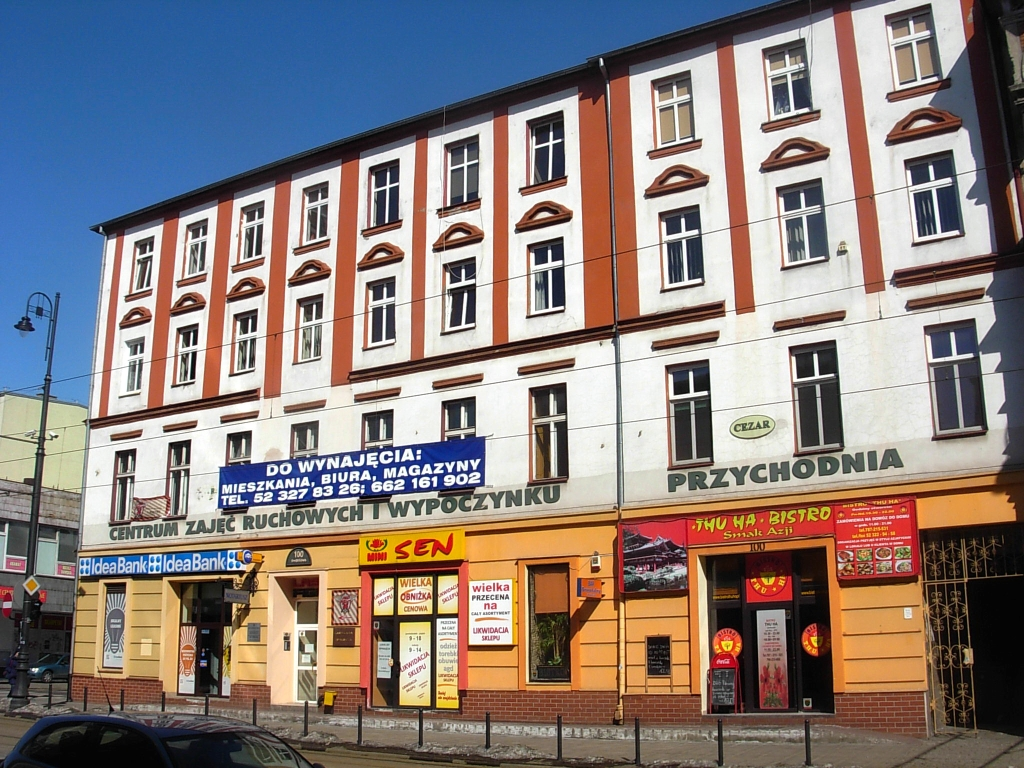
Facade on Dworcowa Street

=== Main train Station ===
1851, 1968, 2015

Modern architecture

Oldest and largest railway station in Bydgoszcz, it has undergone a major rebuilding which ended in December 2015.

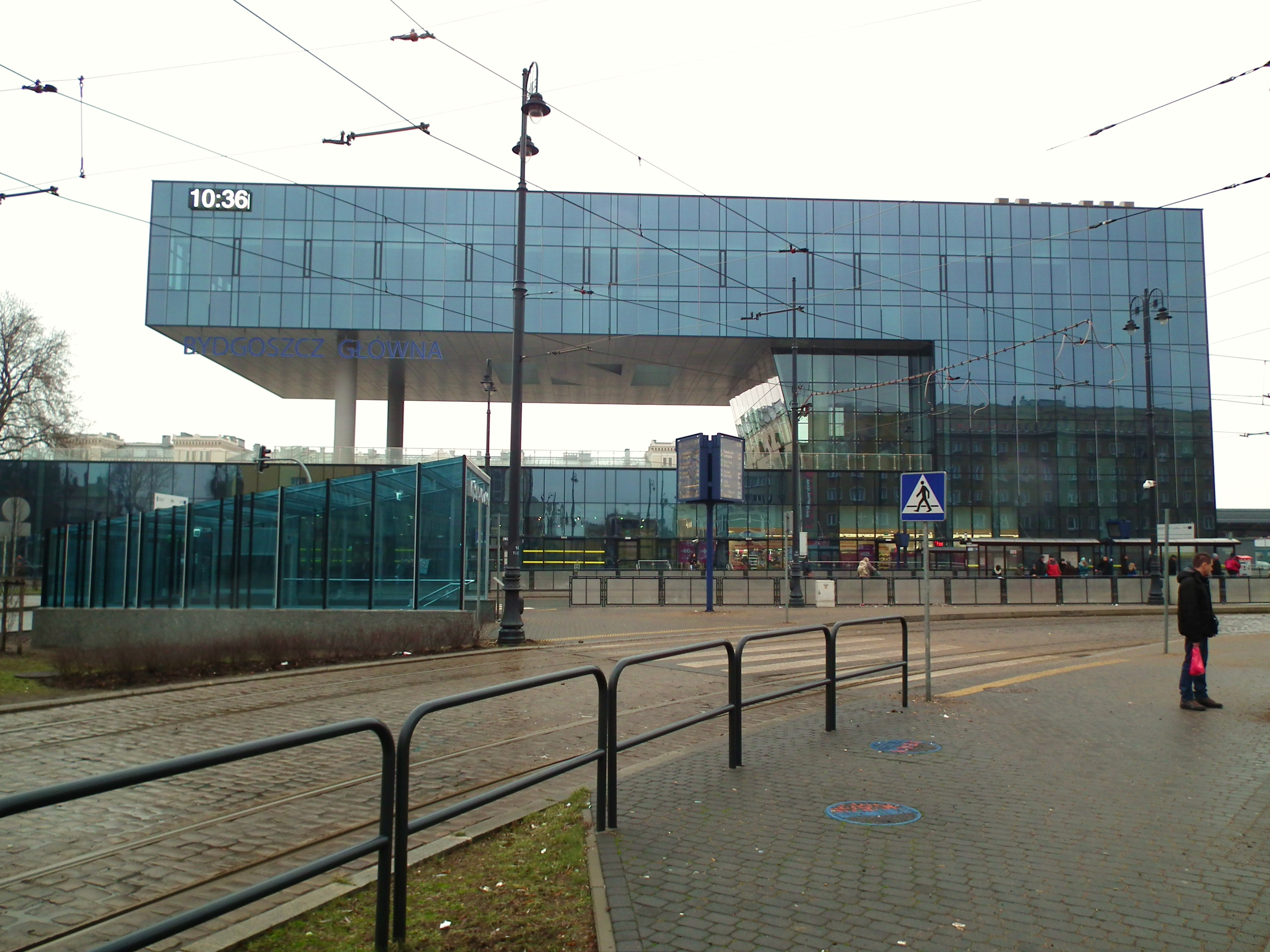
New train station building

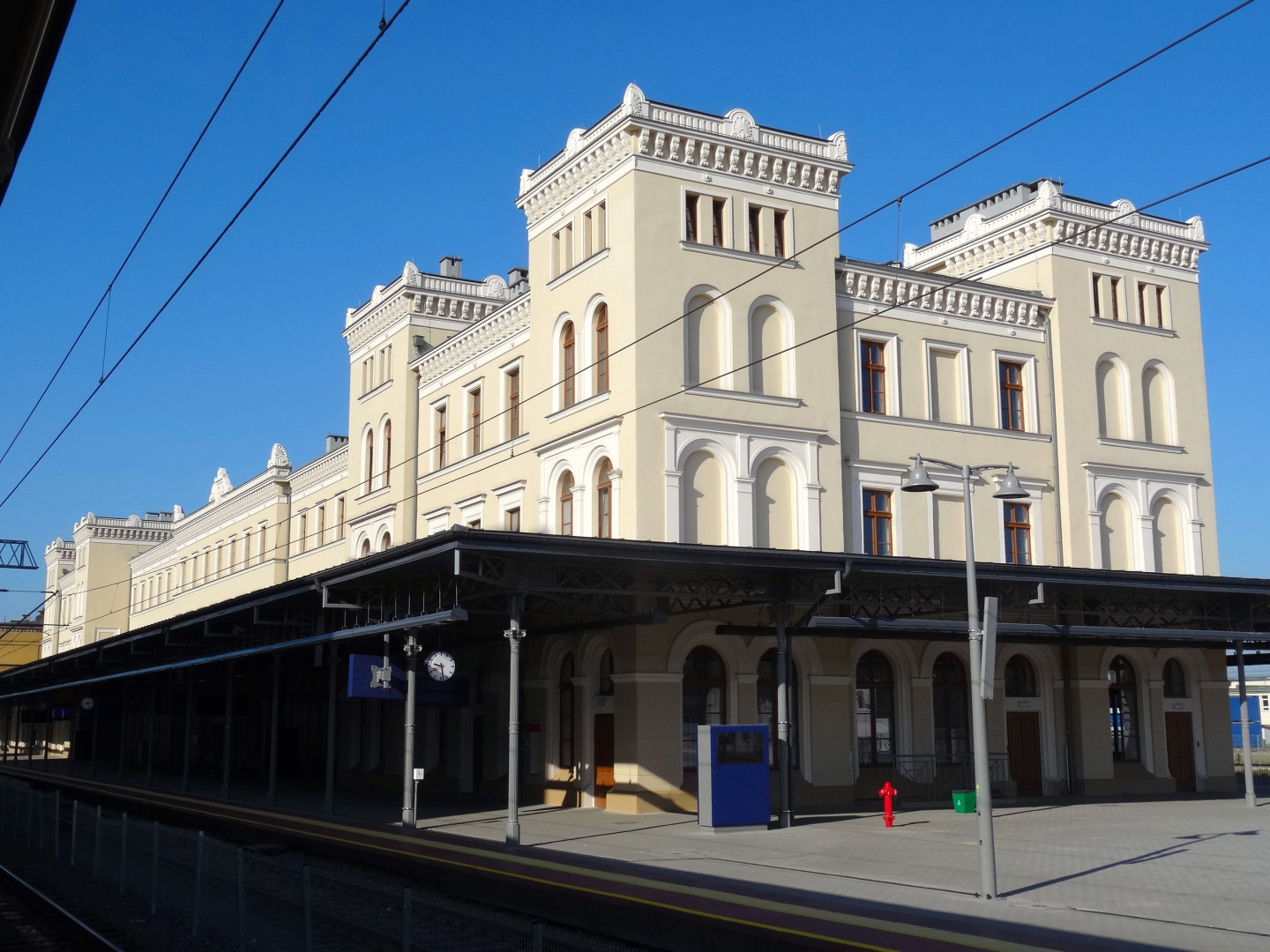
The historical terminal renovated
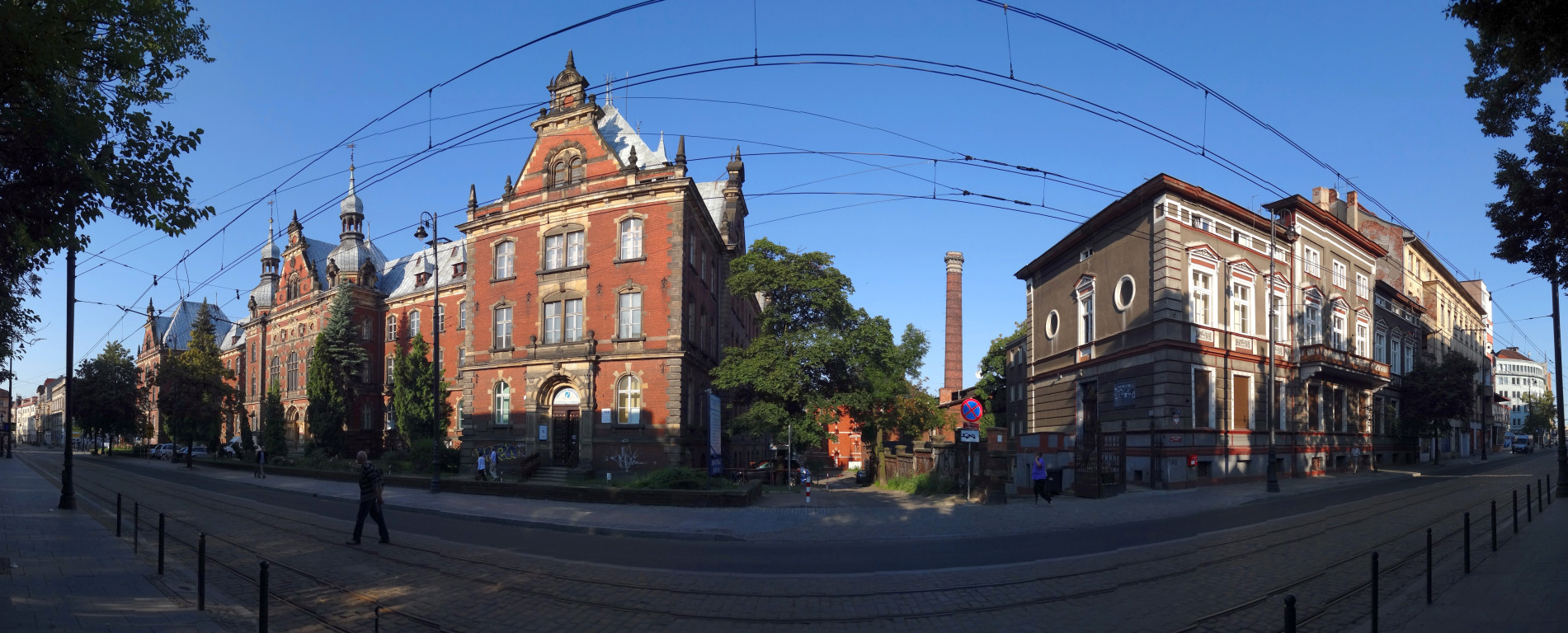
Dworcowa street, Prussian Eastern Railway Headquarters (left), State Archives building (right)

== See also ==
- Bydgoszcz
- Gdańska Street
- Pomorska Street in Bydgoszcz
- Jan and Jędrzej Śniadecki Street in Bydgoszcz
- MAKRUM

== Bibliography ==
- (in Polish) Derenda, Jerzy (2006). Piękna stara Bydgoszcz, t. I z serii Bydgoszcz, miasto na Kujawach. Bydgoszcz: warzystwo Miłośników Miasta Bydgoszczy. ISBN 9788391617816.
- (in Polish) Bręczewska-Kulesza, Daria. Przegląd stylów występujących w bydgoskiej architekturze drugiej połowy XIX i początku XX stulecia. Bydgoszcz.
- (in Polish) Jastrzębska-Puzowska, Iwona (2005). Od miasteczka do metropolii. Rozwój architektoniczny i urbanistyczny Bydgoszczy w latach 1850-1920. Toruń: Wydawnictwo MADO. ISBN 9788389886385.
- (in Polish) Umiński, Janusz (1996). Bydgoszcz. Przewodnik. Bydgoszcz: Regionalny Oddział PTTK "Szlak Brdy".
- (in Polish) Derkowska-Kostkowska, Bogna (2001). Józef Swiecicki – szkic biografii bydgoskiego budowniczego. Materiały do dziejów kultury i sztuki Bydgoszczy i regionu, z. 6. Bydgoszcz: Pracownia Dokumentacji i Popularyzacji Zabytków Wojewódzkiego Ośrodka Kultury w Bydgoszczy. pp. 32–50.
- (in Polish) Bręczewska-Kulesza, Daria (2001). Rozwój budownictwa hotelowego w Bydgoszczy w 2. polowie XIX i na początku XX wieku. Materiały do dziejów kultury i sztuki Bydgoszczy i regionu, z. 7. Bydgoszcz: Pracownia Dokumentacji i Popularyzacji Zabytków Wojewódzkiego Ośrodka Kultury w Bydgoszczy. pp. 61–85.
