= Wool Market Square, Bydgoszcz =

Square in Bydgoszcz, Poland

Coordinates: 53°07′16″N 17°59′44″E

Wełniany Rynek
Bydgoszcz
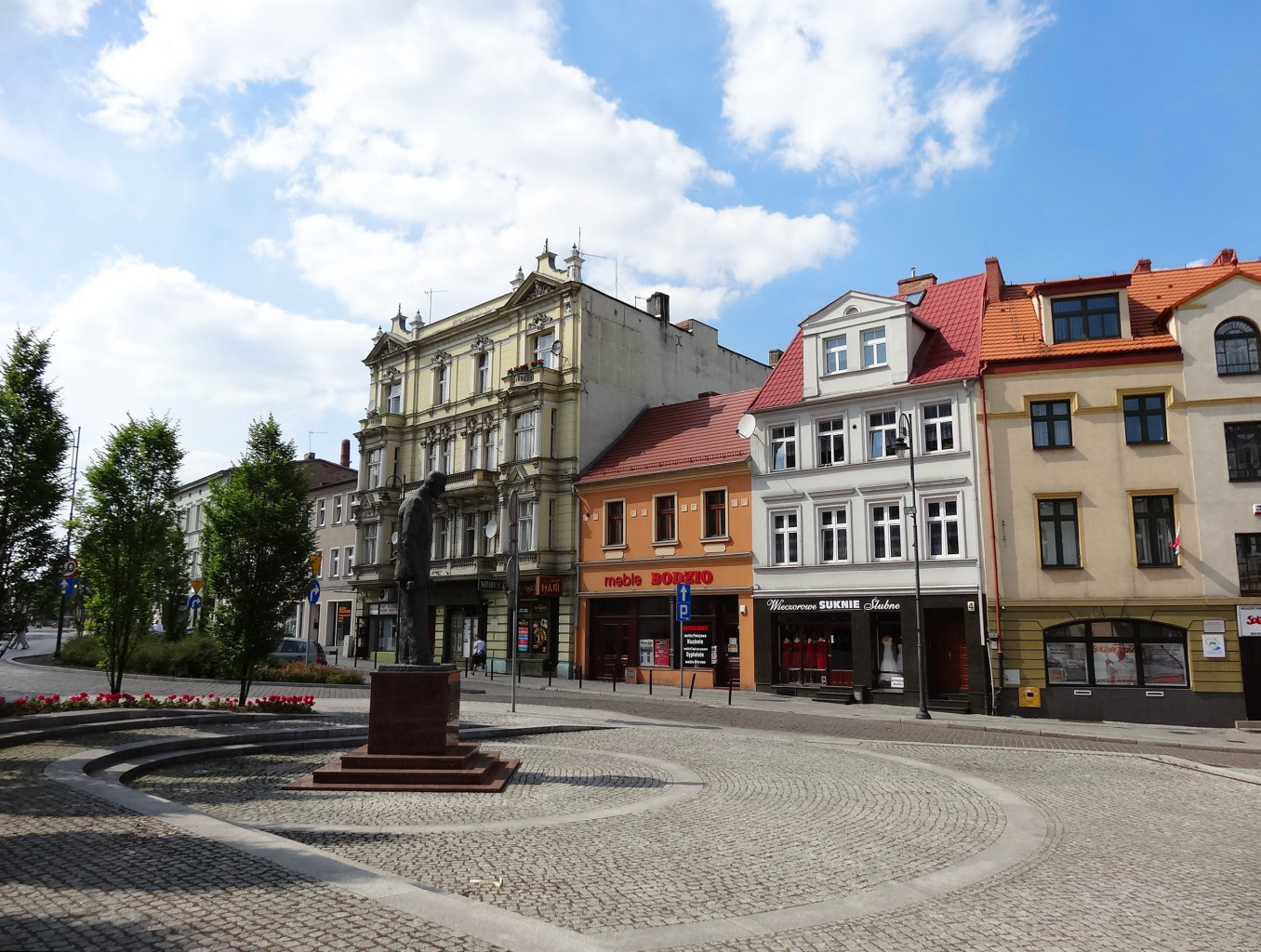
- Northern frontages

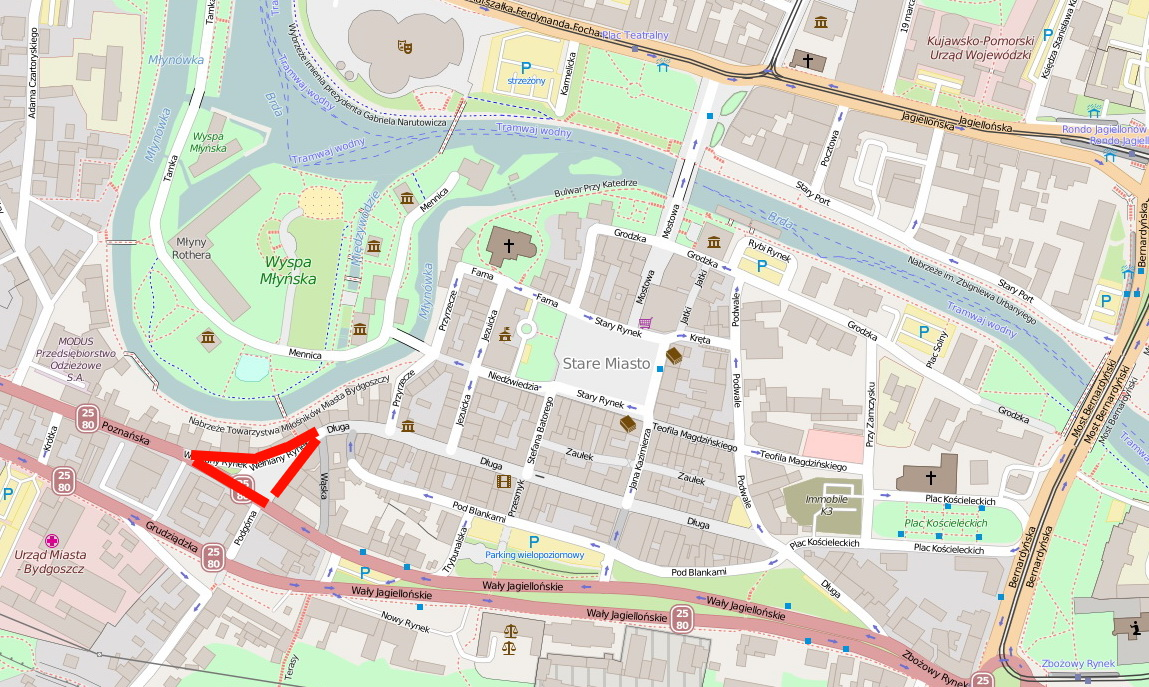
- Location of the square in Bydgoszcz
- Native name: Wełniany Rynek w Bydgoszczy (Polish)
- Former name: Wollmarkt
- Part of: Bydgoszcz
- Owner: City of Bydgoszcz
- Area: Old Town
- Location: Bydgoszcz, Poland

Wool Market square is located in Bydgoszcz, Poland. Many of its buildings are either registered on Kuyavian-Pomeranian Voivodeship heritage list, or part of Bydgoszcz local history. On its centre stands a statue of Leon Barciszewski, mayor of Bydgoszcz (1932–1939).

== Location ==
The triangular square is located in the southern part of Bydgoszcz Old Town. It links the western tip of Długa street to Poznańska street, a busy thoroughfare. Houses on the northern frontage have also a view onto Mill Island.

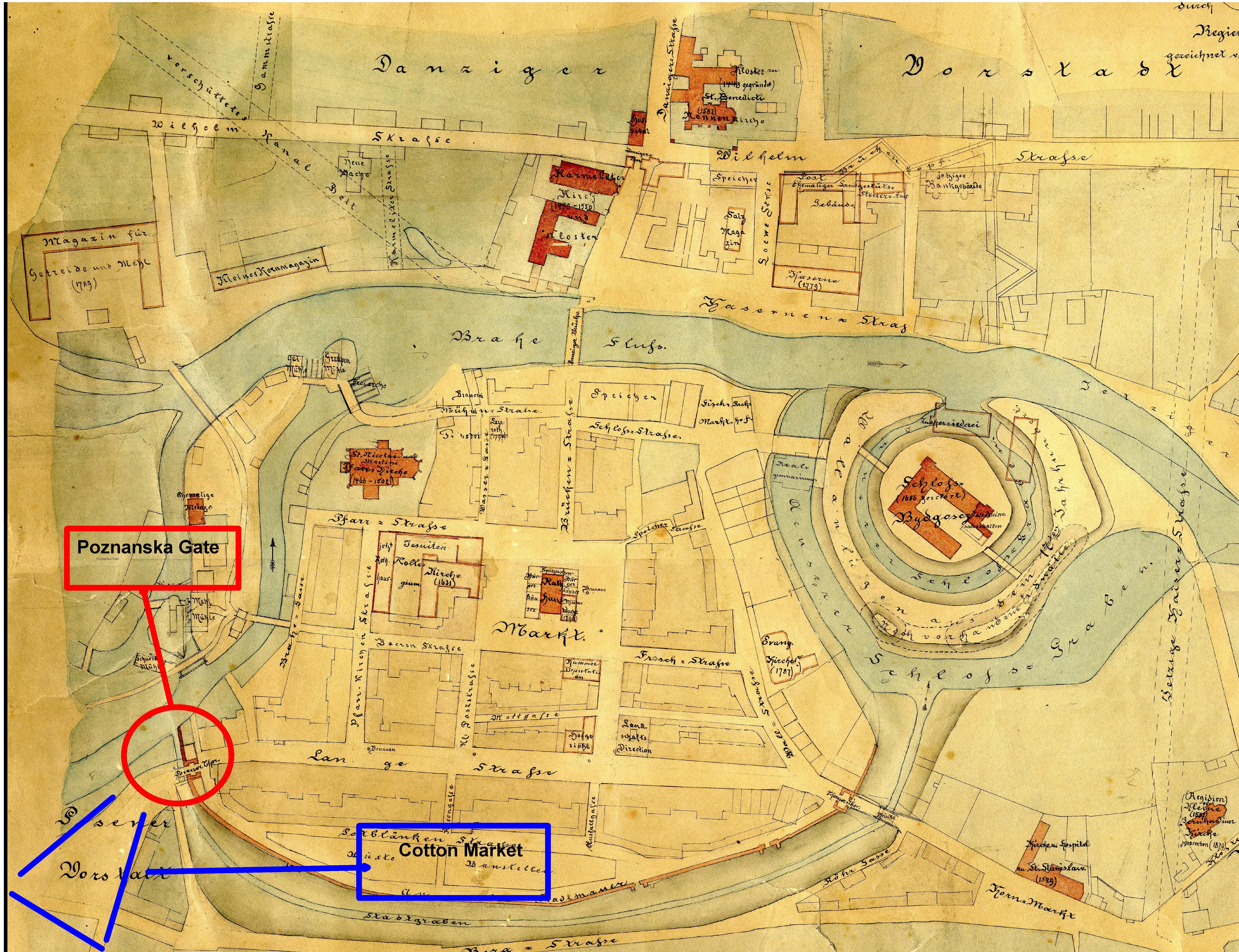
The square on a 16th-century map

== History ==
The area ties in the square outside the walls of the city, just beyond the Poznań Gate, located at today's western tip of Długa street. Such gate stood from 14th to first half of 19th century, built several times with various materials (brick, wood). Because of the bottle neck it was creating in Długa street, the Poznan Gate was demolished in 1828, and last rubbles evacuated in 1835. During the entire 18th century, one of the first city brick factory had been operating up in the area, run by Albert Bohon from Gdańsk.

From 1838 onwards, the triangular square at the junction of Długa, Poznańska, and Podgórna streets was the venue for trading firewood and wool collected from the surrounding farms which ran sheep breedings at the initiative of the "Economic Society for Kujawy" Polish: „Towarzystwa Ekonomicznego dla Kujaw”. With import of overseas cotton, sheep breeding gradually declined, and wool trading disappeared: its traditions remained in the name of the square, officialized in 1854.

When the tram network developed, the first line (1888–1896) ran through Wełniany Rynek along Poznańska street to Church of the Holy Trinity on Swiętej Trojcy street, then further to Grunwaldska street narrow-gauge train station. On the square, a horse station was standing, run by a boy with spare harnessed horses sheltered inside huts. Tram network was electrified in 1896, and the tram line through Wool Market was finally liquidated in 1970.

On the corner with Podgórna Street used to stand a hotel, initially named Hotel Moritz, where Prince Augustus of Prussia died on July 19, 1843, while performing an inspection visit. The hotel name was later changed to French Hotel and Hotel Pomeranian, before being liquidated in 1934.

From 1960 to 2008, the square has been used as a city parking lot. An overhaul of the area with renovation of the pavement has been carried out in 2008, highlighting its architecture and the statue of pre-war president of Bydgoszcz, Leon Barciszewski.

=== Naming ===
Through history, the street bore the following names:

- 1854–1920, Wollmarkt;
- 1920–1939, Wełniany Rynek;
- 1939–1945, Wollmarkt;
- Since 1945, Wełniany Rynek.

The name refers to the area where wool used to be traded from the surroundings in the middle of the 19th century.

== Main places and buildings ==
House at 1

1800-1850

Eclecticism

The tenement built in the first half of the 18th century was initially addressed at Wollmarkt 8. It had for first landlord August Arnholt, a wood merchant.

Subsequent renovations in the 20th century changed its shape (addition of a second storey) and wiped away the facade decoration.

Wilhelm Kopp's Tenement at 2

1896–1897, by Józef Święcicki

Neo-Baroque

The building has been realized by famous Bydgoszcz architect of the 19th century Józef Święcicki, who designed more than 60 projects in the 1890s in the city. The commissioner of the tenement at then Wollmarkt 9 was Wilhelm Kopp, an entrepreneur and owner of a thriving dye house at nearby Swiętej Trojcy street 4/6. One of his sons, Julius, lived in this building till World War II. Today, the ground floor houses a night club, Stara Babcia.

Truthful to his art, Józef Święcicki reproduced here the Neo-Baroque features he was fond of, as in other famous realisations across downtown (e.g. Hotel "Pod Orlem", Plac Wolności 1, Theatre square 2). The facade is covered with architectural details and motifs: bossage, bay windows, balustrades, columns, pilasters, pediments bearing ornamented tympanums, coat of arms and finials on the roof.

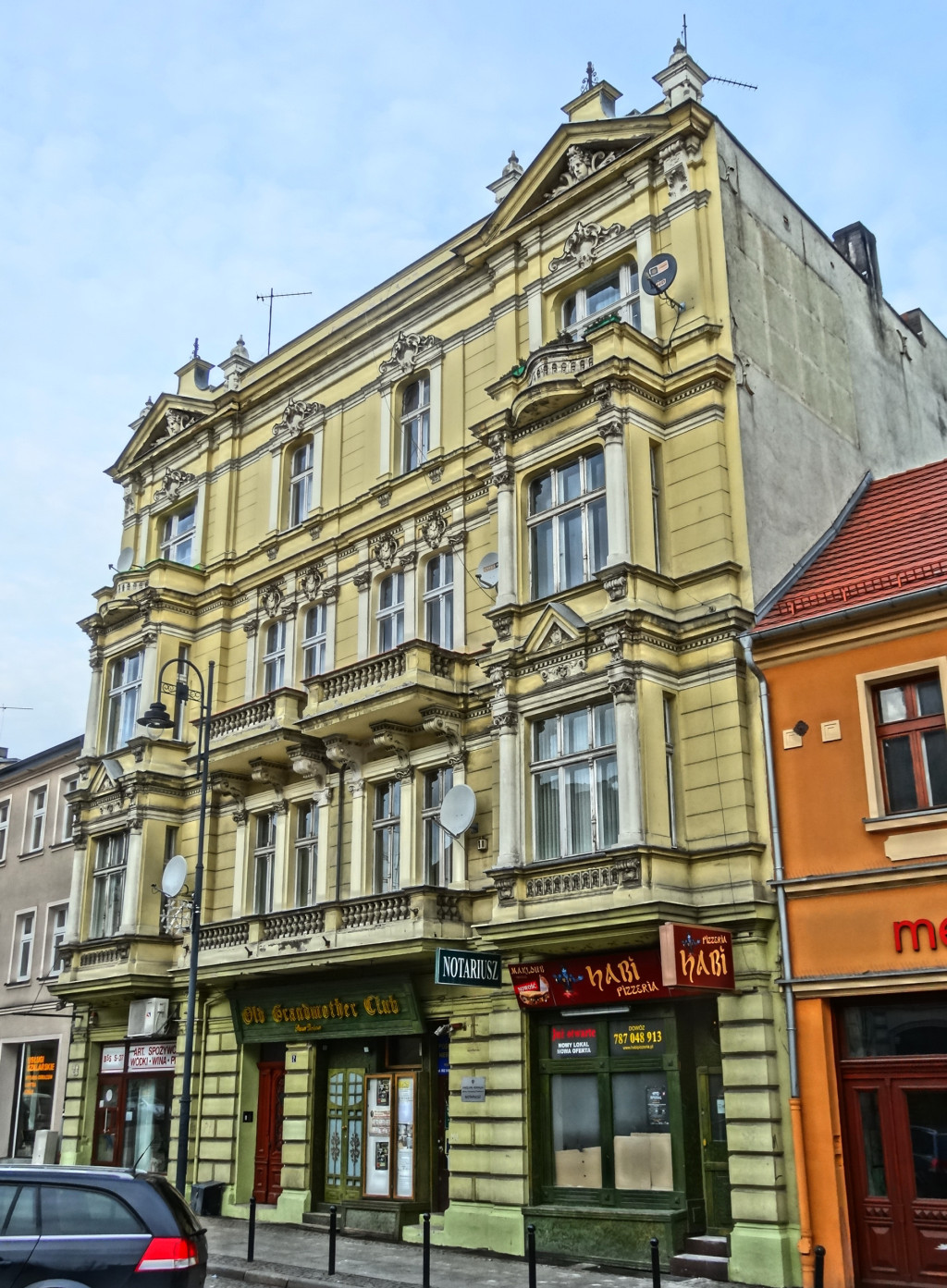
Main elevation

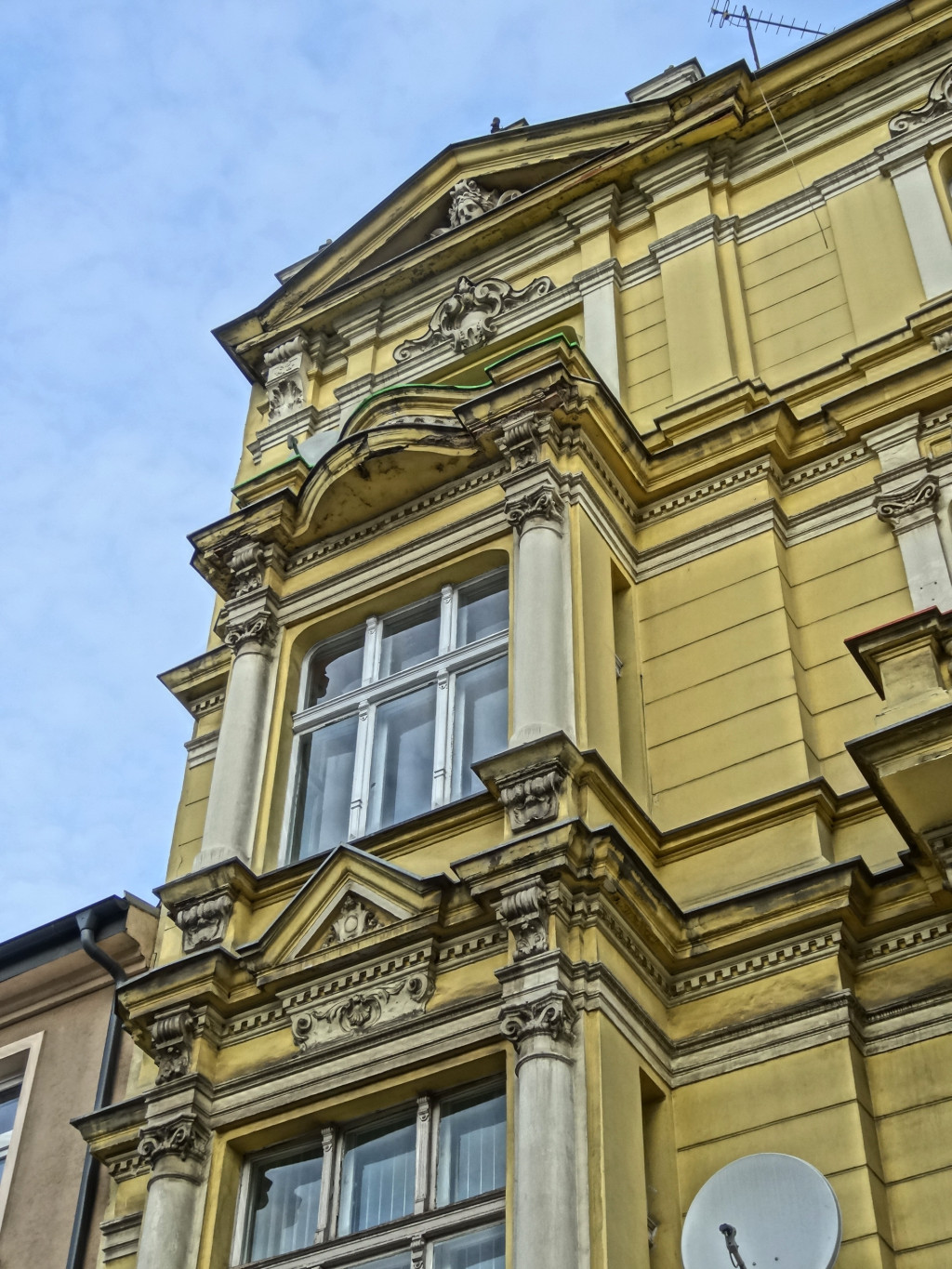
Bay window detail

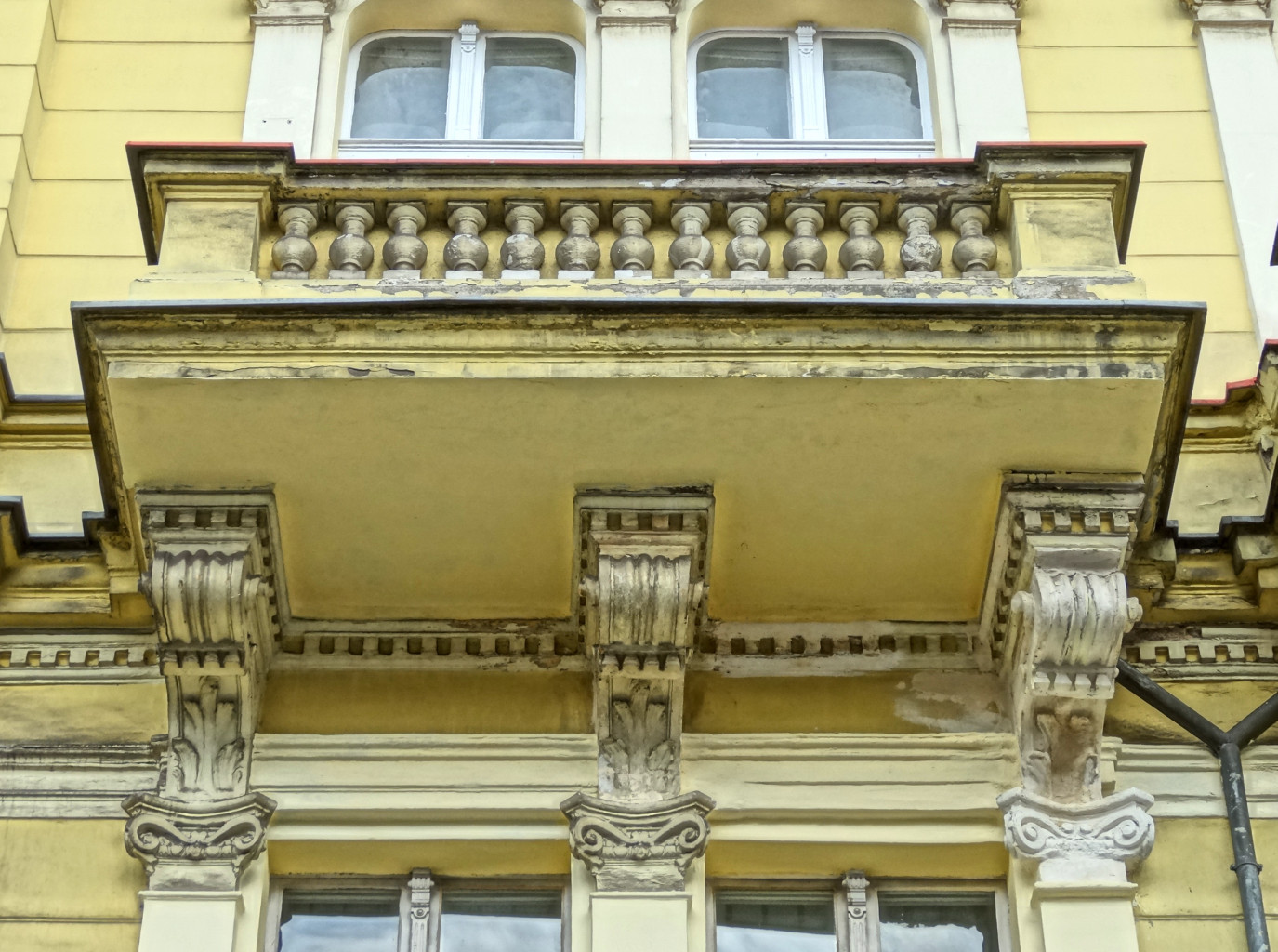
Adorned balcony

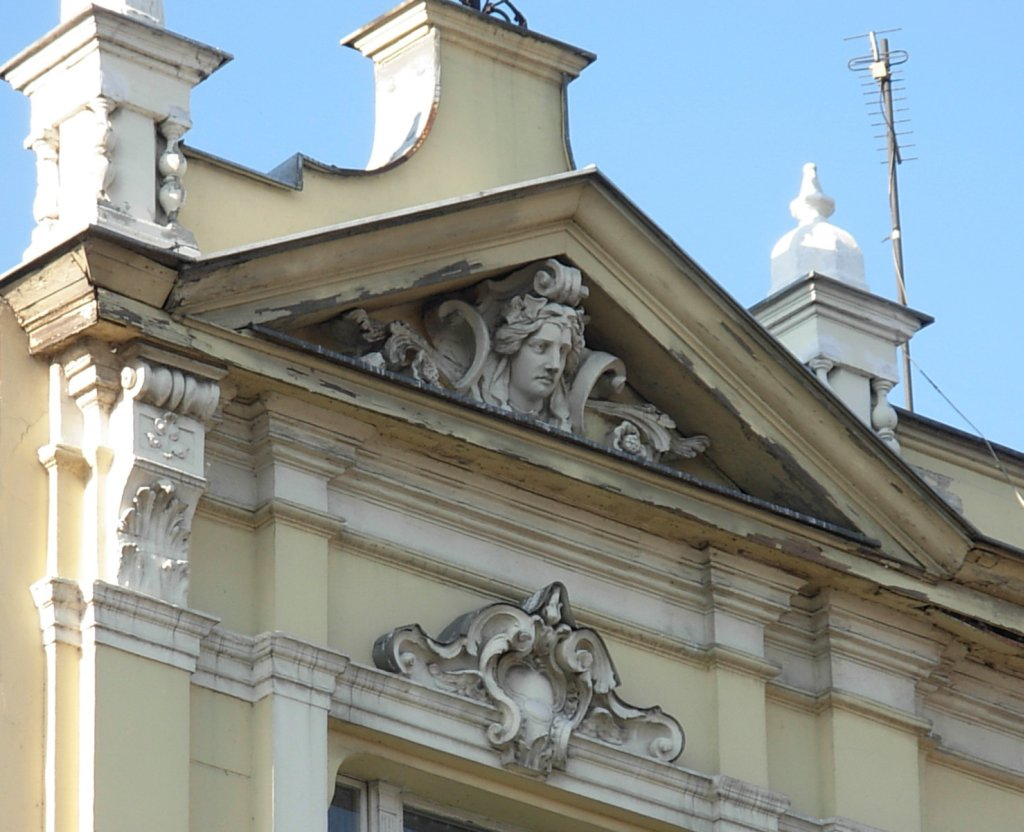
Tympanum

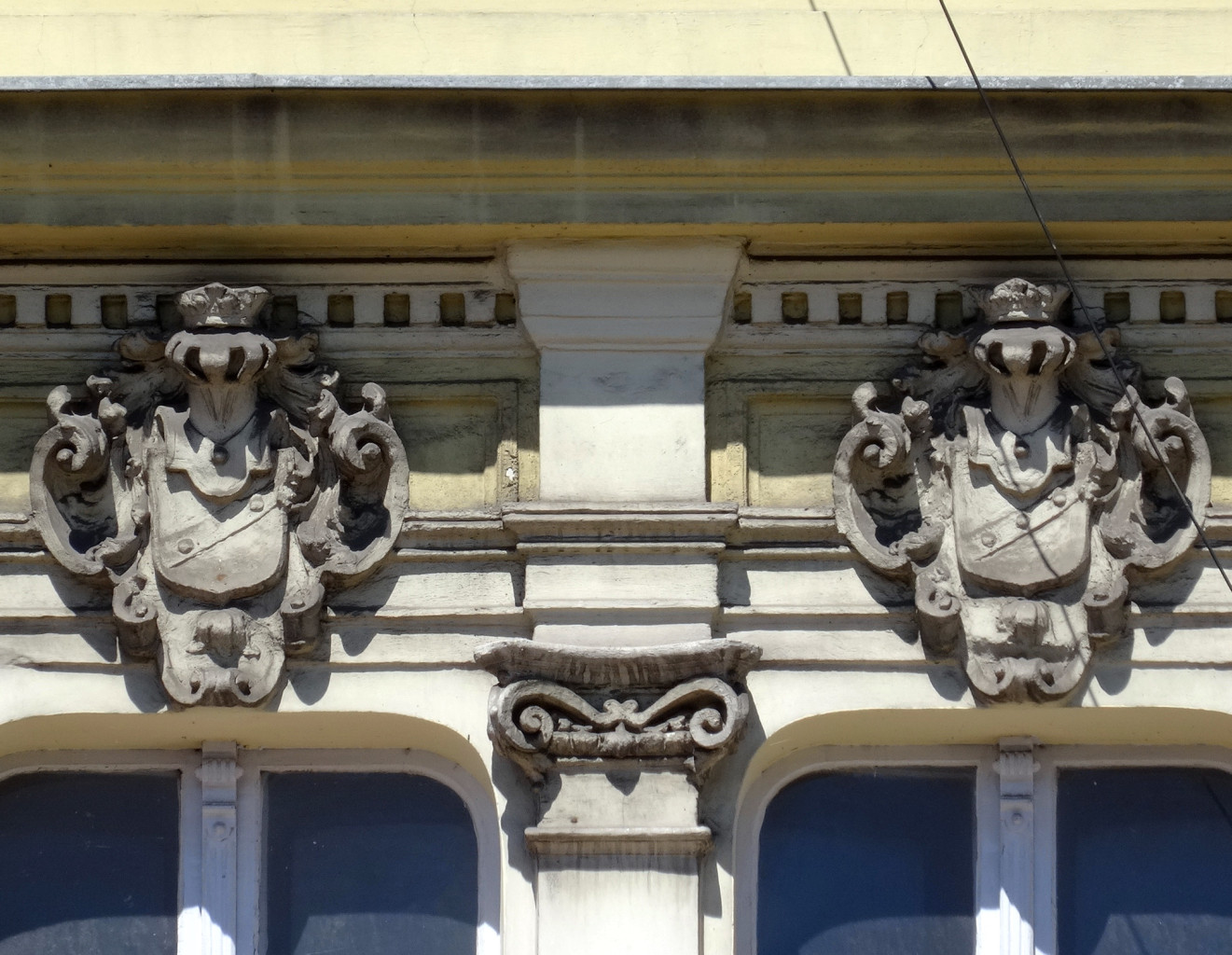
Coat of arms

House at 3

1800-1850

Eclecticism

Late 19th century pictures of the house at then Wollmarkt 10 confirm that the landlord, a milliner named ßintus Berg had been running there his shop. Still leading his hatmaking as a rentier, he moved in the 1910s to Danziger straße 147, now Gdańska Street 42. Today, the tenement houses a furniture shop, Bodzio.

The architecture of this house, with simple elements and gable, reflects other contemporary buildings from the 1850s that one can find in downtown Bydgoszcz (Focha street 6, Gdańska 40).

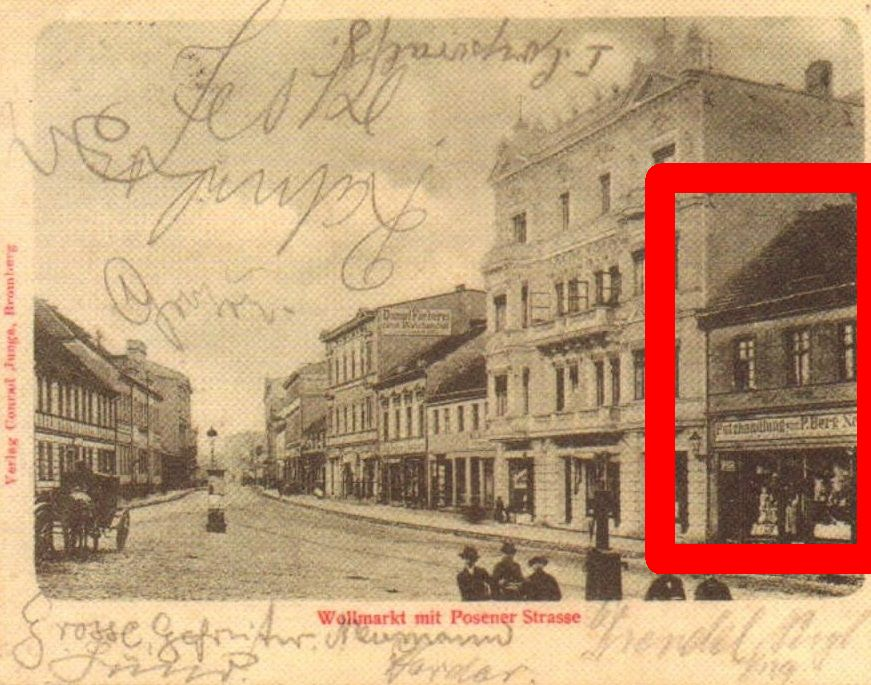
Berg's shop highlighted on a 1905 postcard

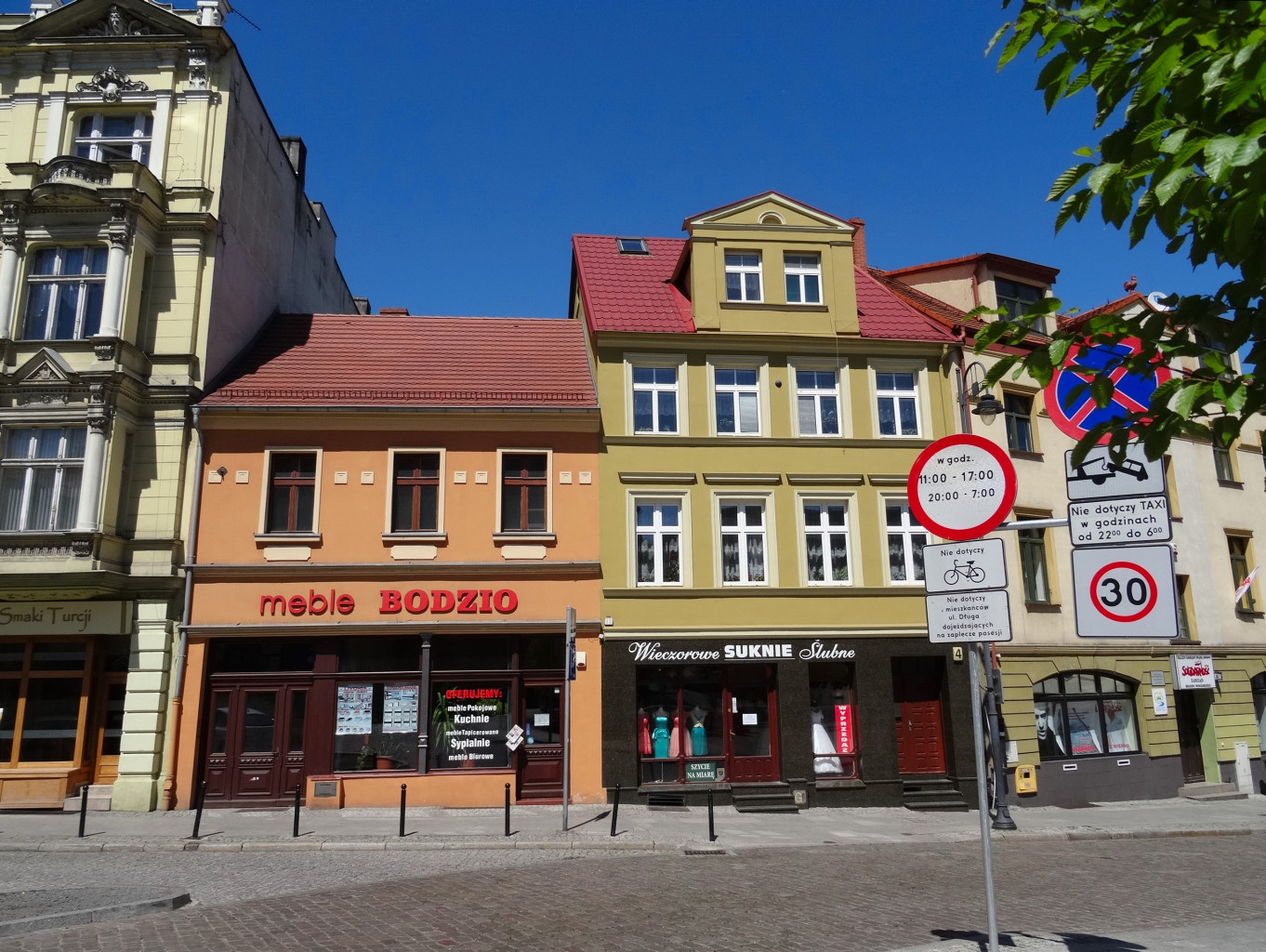
N.o3 (left) with orange painted facade

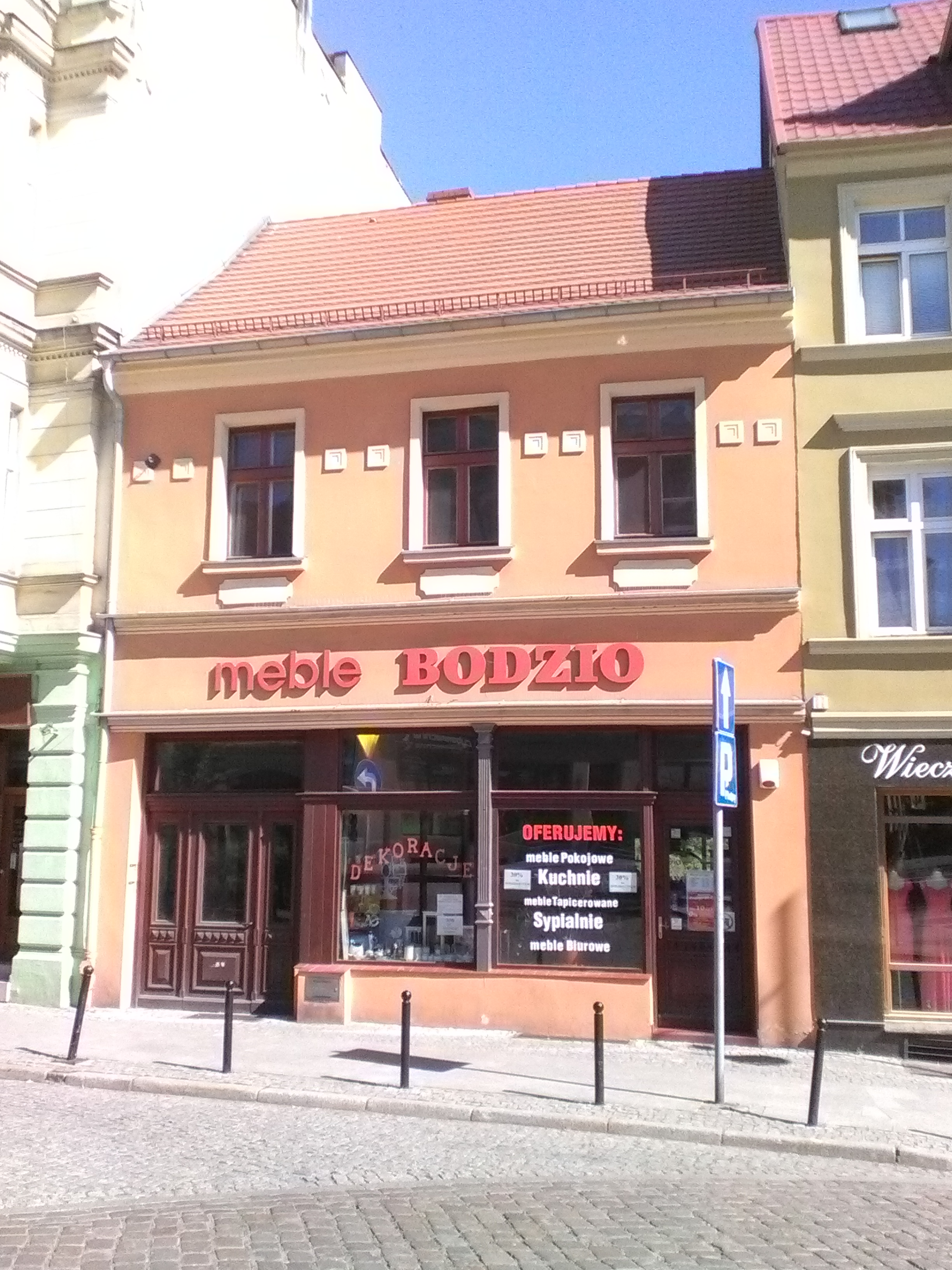
Main elevation

House at 4

Registered on Kuyavian-Pomeranian Voivodeship Heritage list, Nr.601428 Reg.A/1092 (January 27, 1994)

1774

Neo-Renaissance

This house, then at Wollmarkt 11, is the oldest on the square. It has been rebuilt in 1879. The neo-renaissance facade, crowned by a large dormer, displays a cannonball on the second floor, between windows. It could be a reminder of the 1794 Kościuszko Uprising. Before the outbreak of World War I, the landlord was Carl Köseling, who had a barber and hairdresser shop.

A restoration has been carried out in 2014.

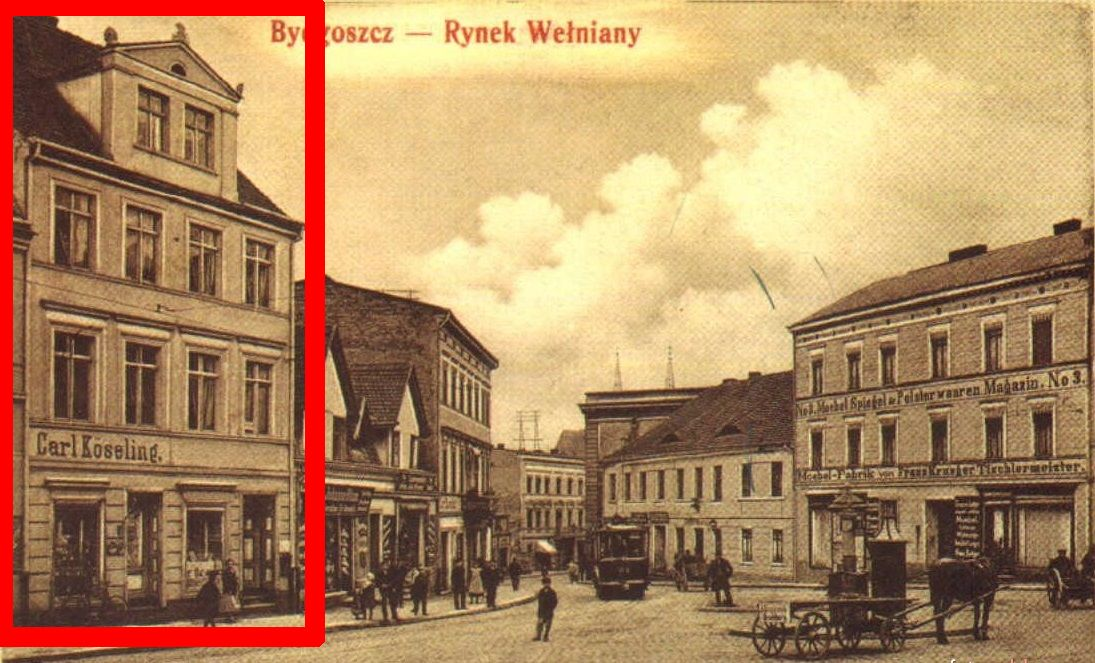
The house, at Carl Köseling, ca 1910

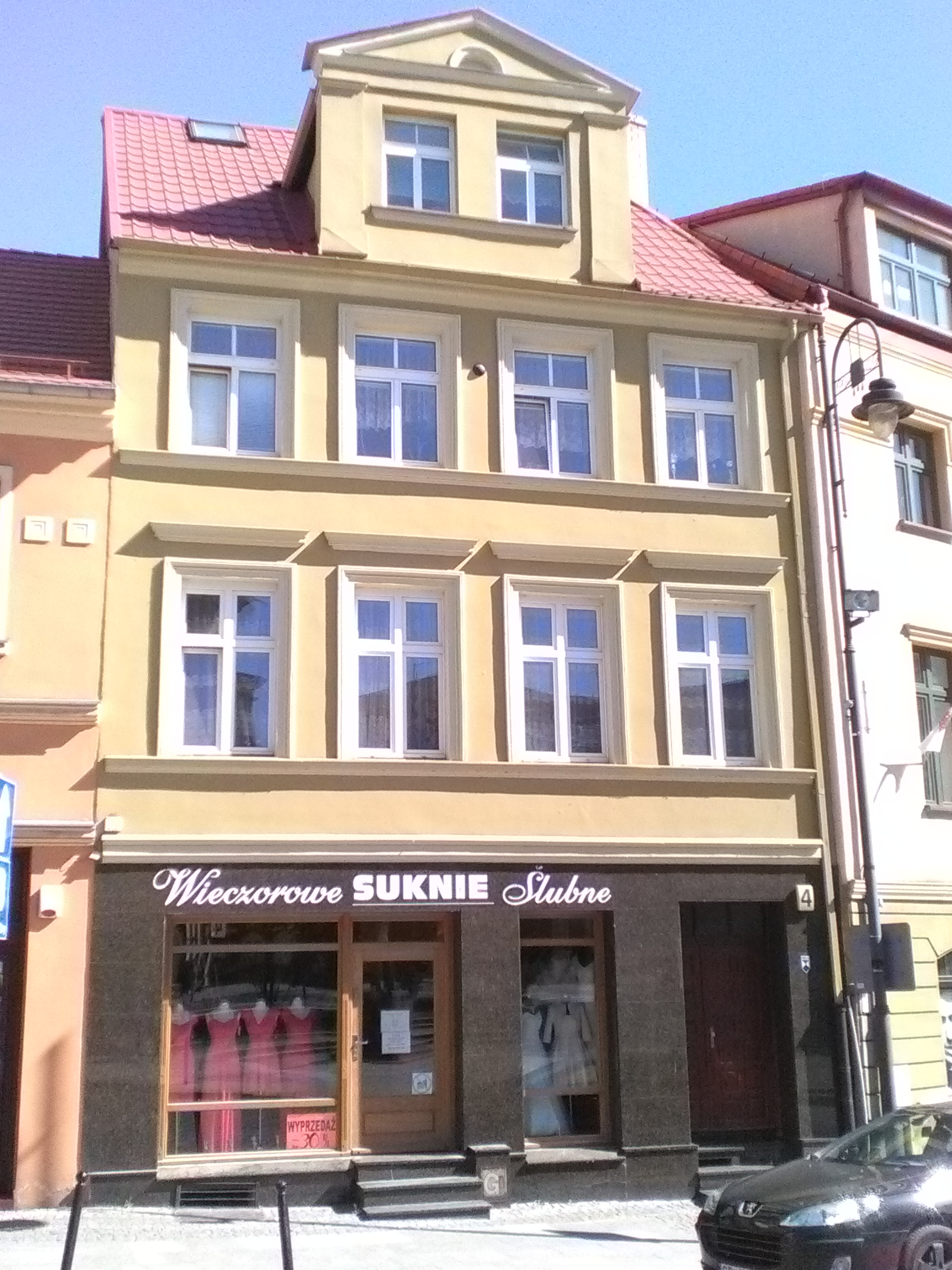
Main elevation on the square

House at 5

Built after 1915

Early Modern architecture, elements of Art Nouveau

Prior to this 20th-century building, address was Wollmarkt 12: the re-construction occurred under the ownership of Julius Wiśniewski, pastry and flour merchant. Today, the tenement harbours Bydgoszcz seat of Solidarność onto the square; the facade onto Mill Island accommodates a cafe (Polish: kawiarnia), Płotka Caffe.

The elevation boasts three superb but discreet stained glasses, on its middle part towering the main entrance, on an Art Nouveau style.

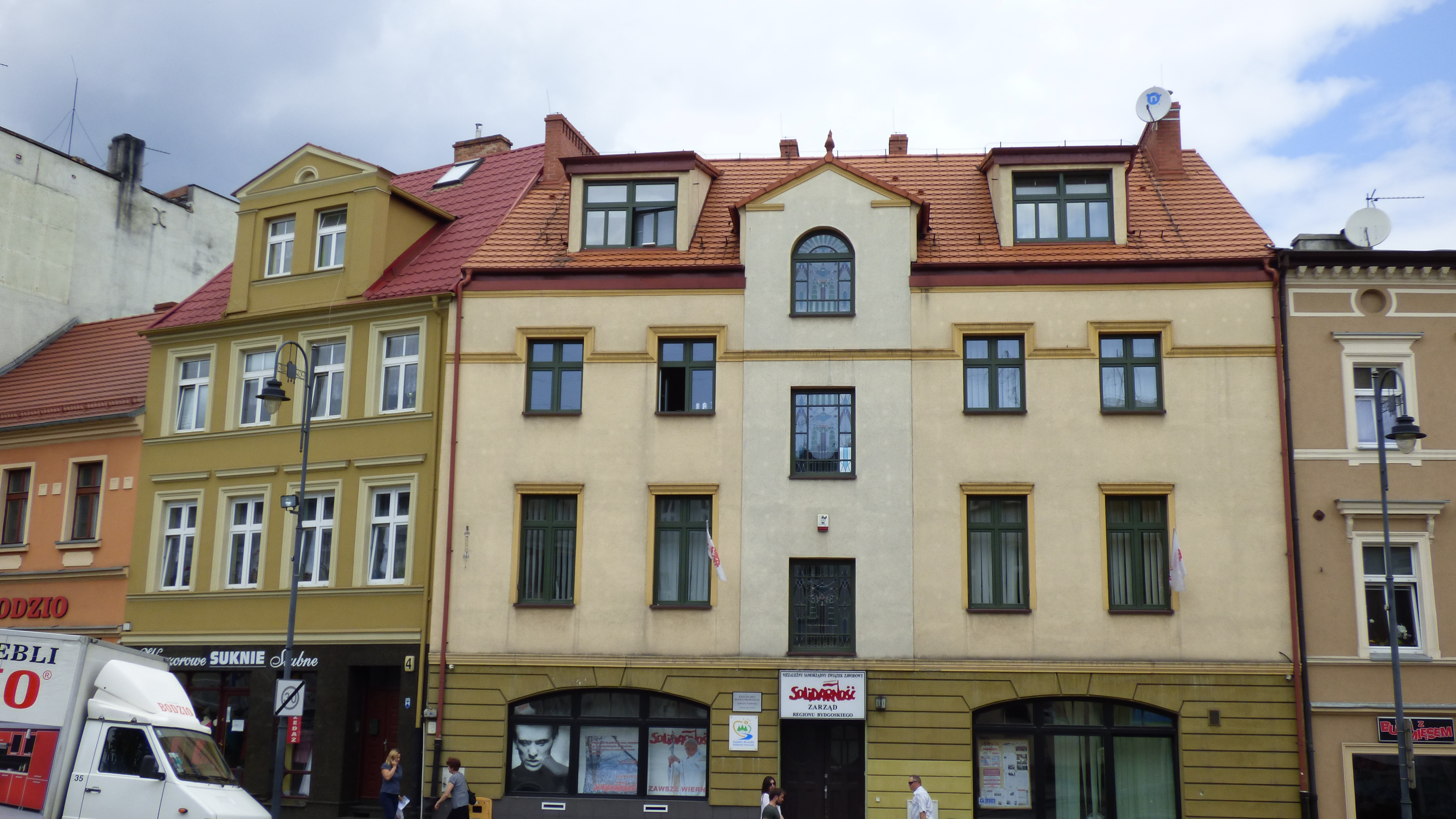
Main elevation

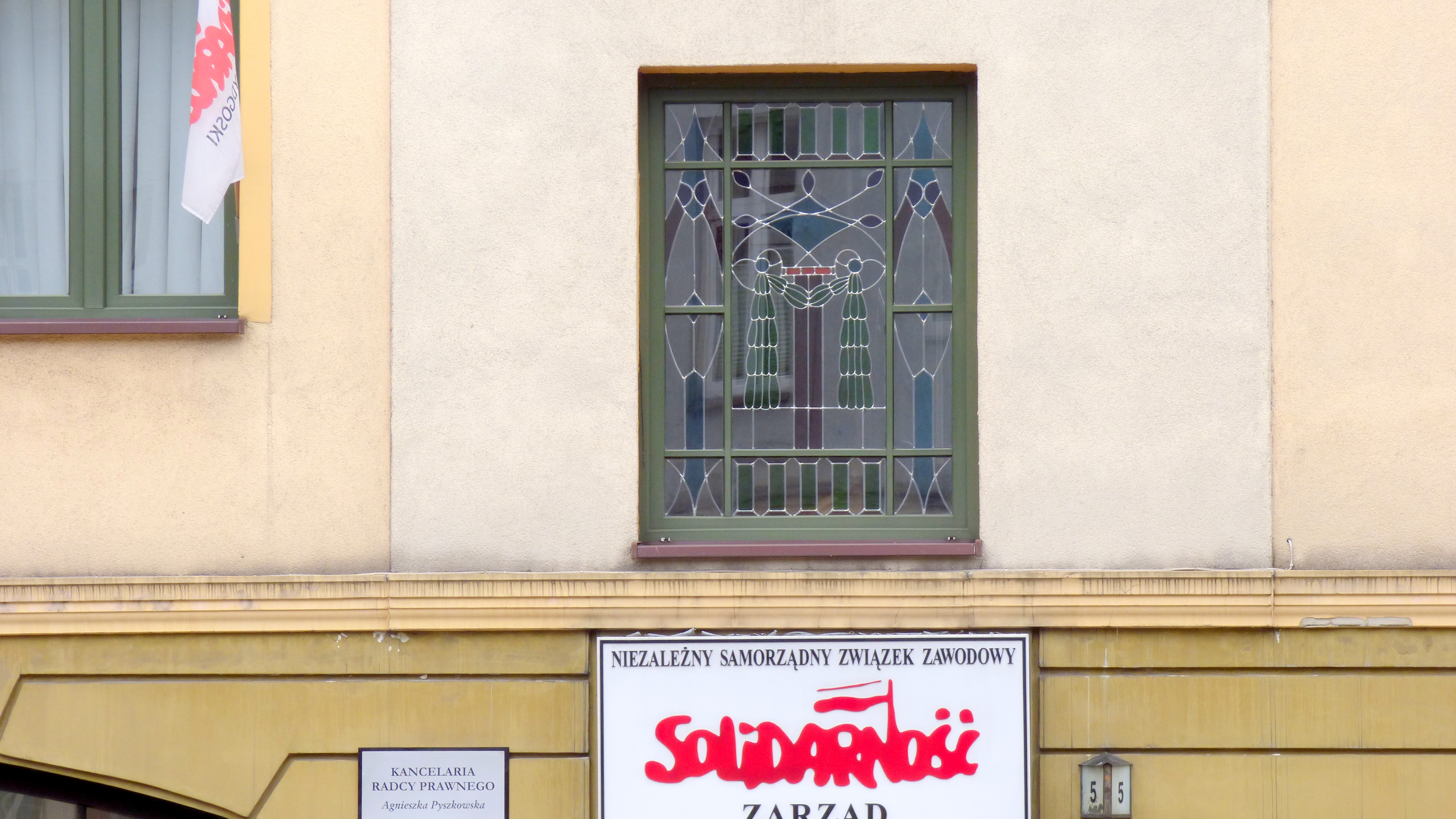
Ground floor stained glass

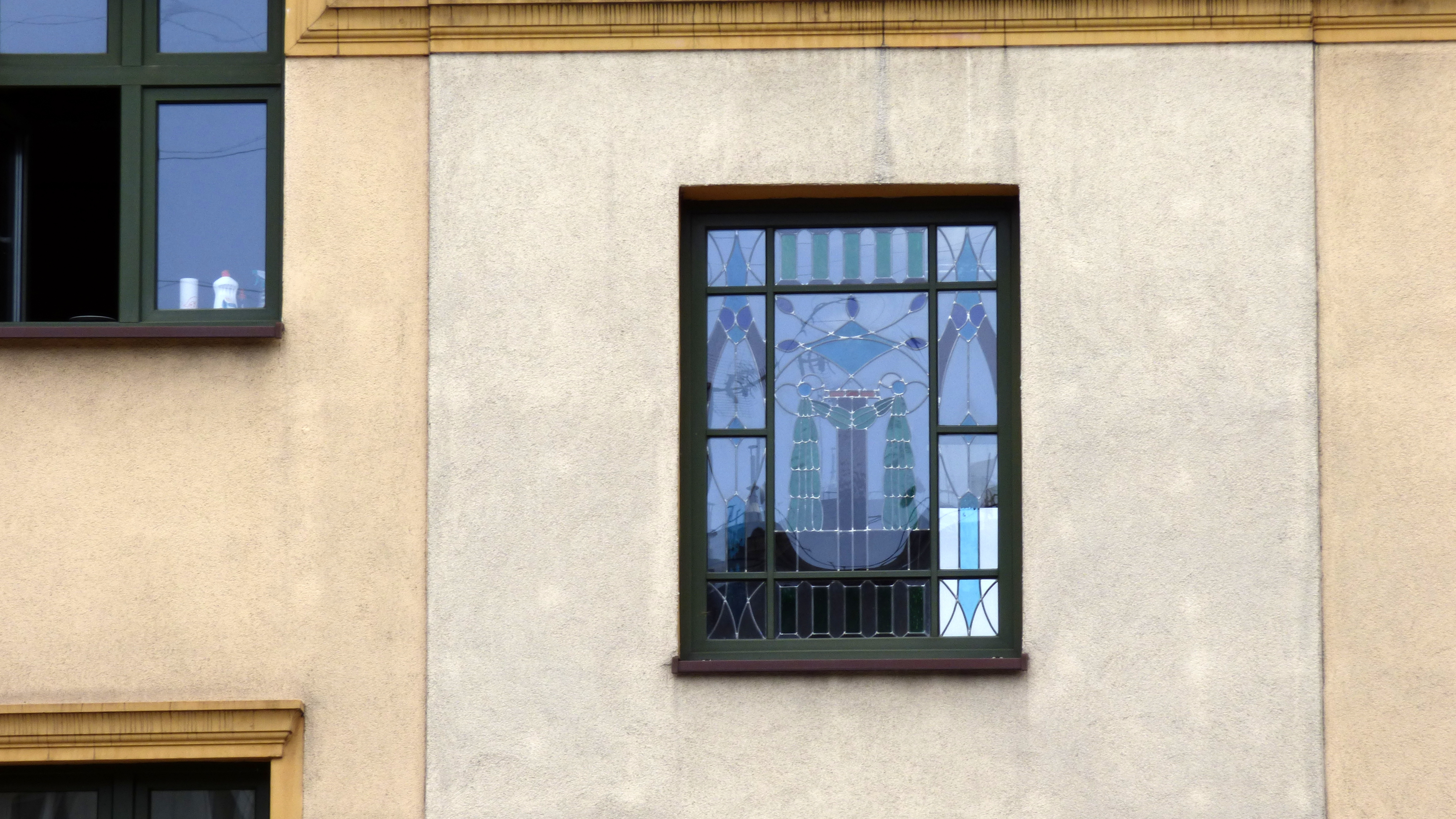
First floor stained glass

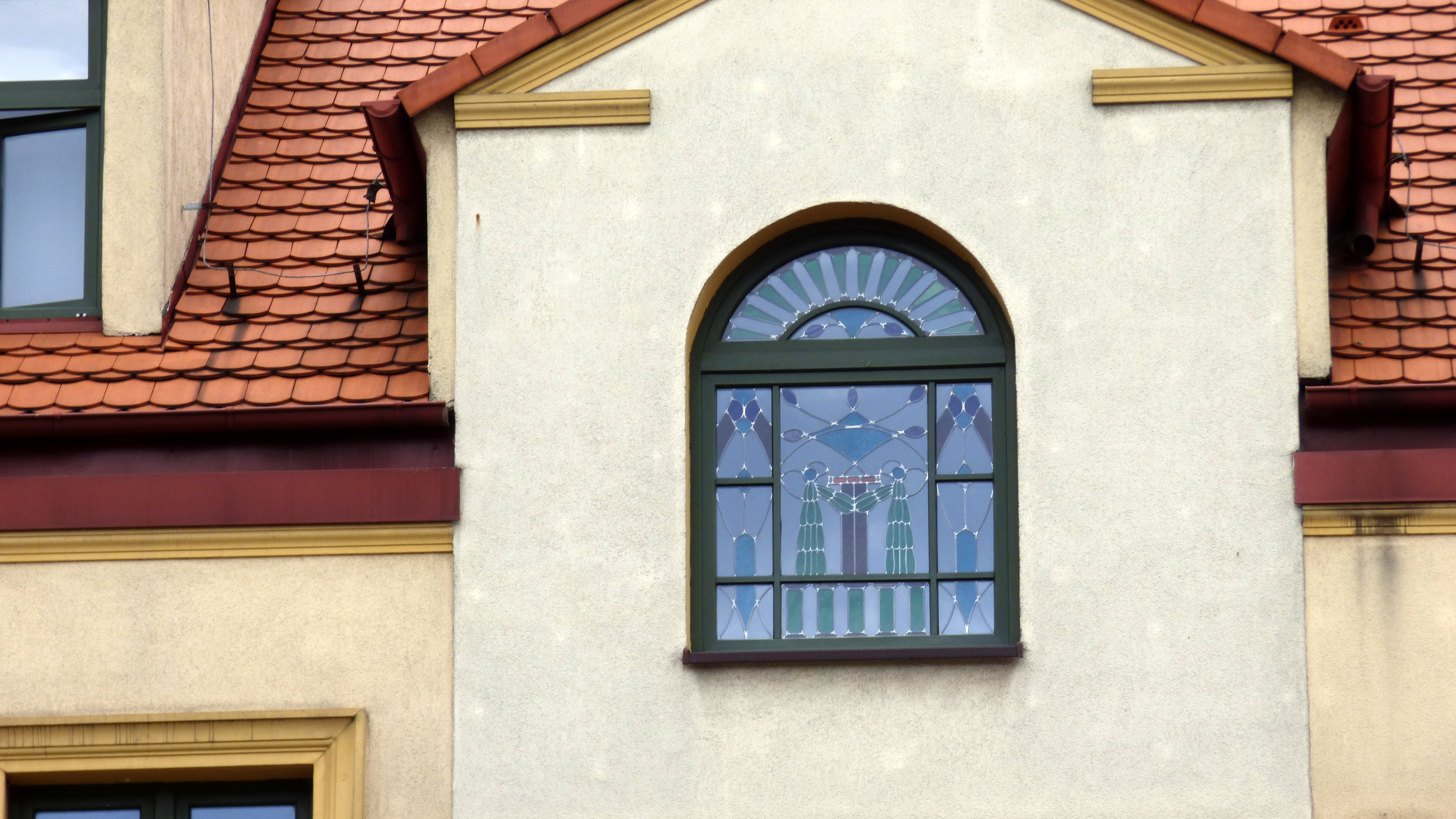
Second floor stained glass

Houses at 6/6A

1850

Neoclassical architecture

At the end of the 19th century, Carl Gundlach ran there a glaziery shop selling porcelain, till the outburst of the First World War. These two buildings, then at one same address, Wollmarkt 13, have always housed many tenants, from a dozen in 1890 to 17 in the late 1920s.

Both facades display plainly neoclassical features. The tenements have undergone a thorough overhaul in 2010.

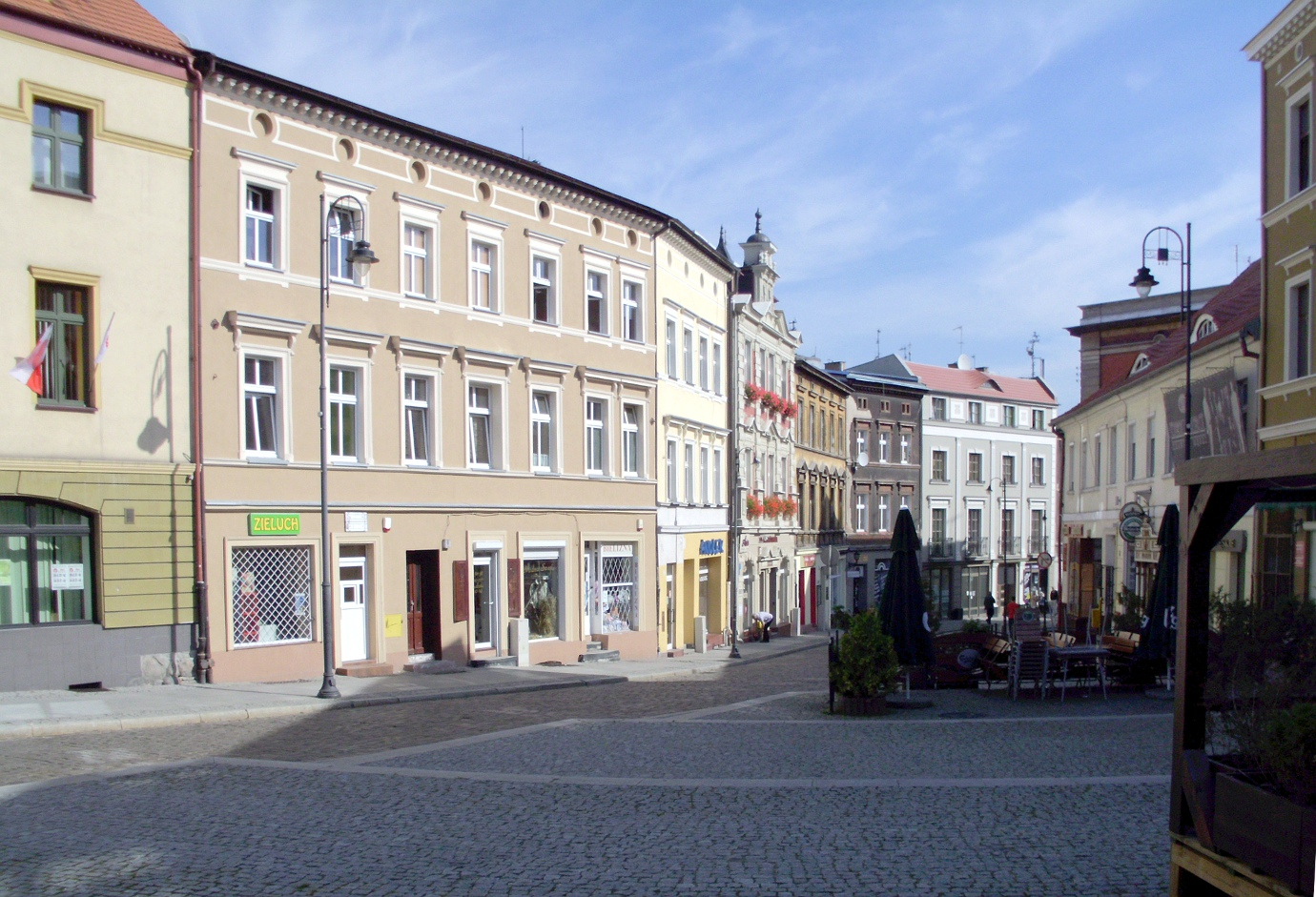
Nr.6 on the left (light brown), Nr.6A on its right

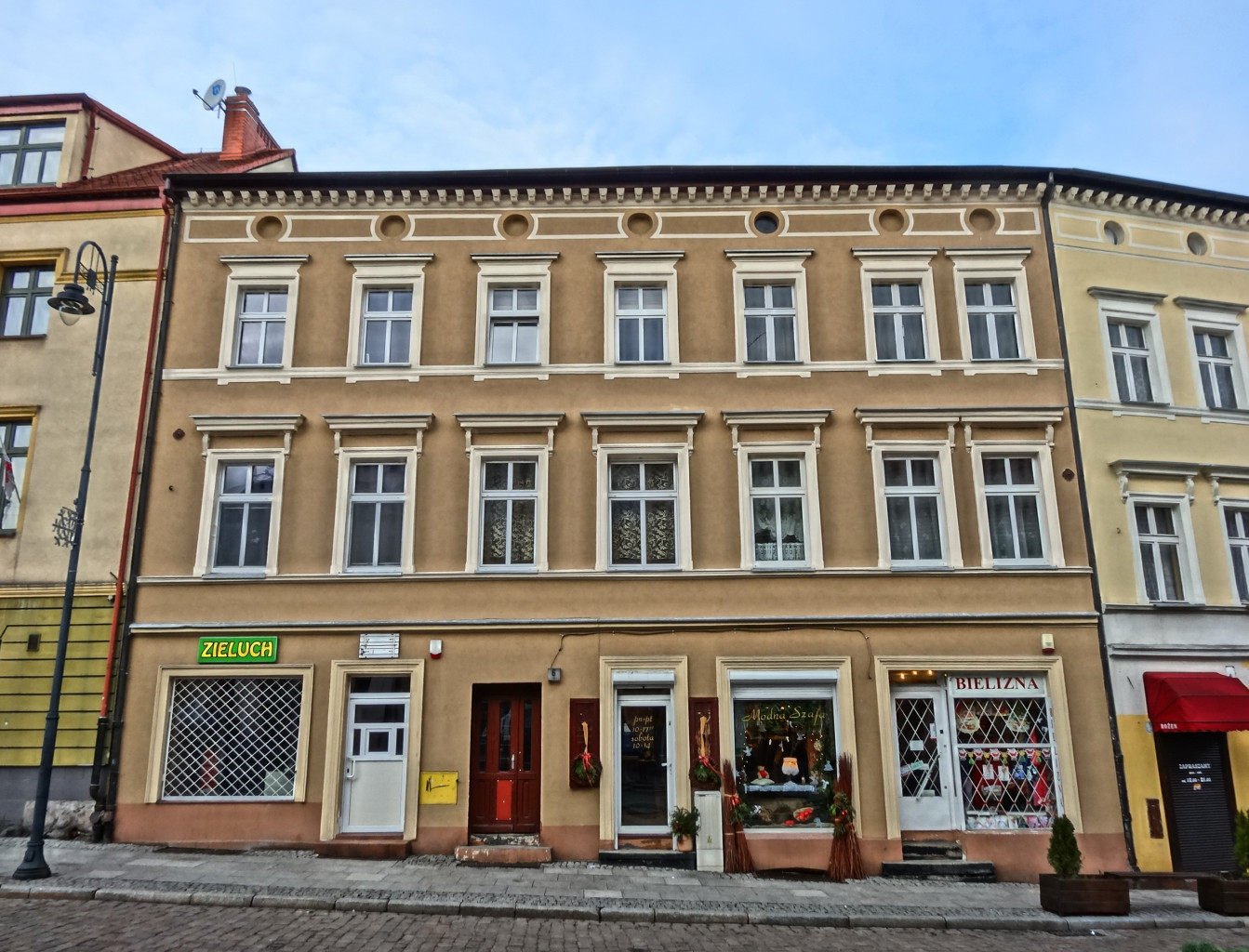
Facade of Nr.6

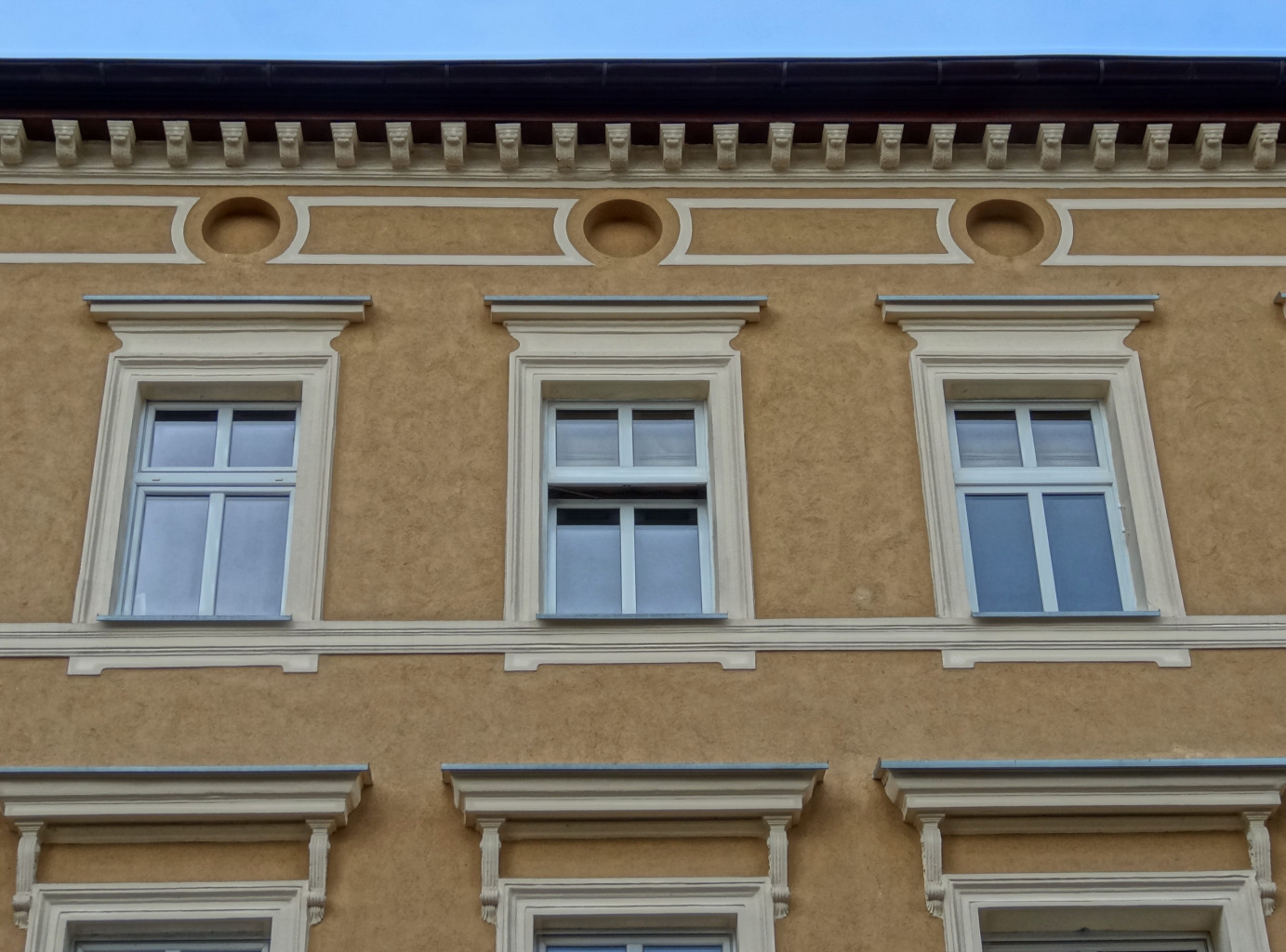
Detail of corbel tables at Nr.6

Hoffmann's house at 7

1889, by Józef Święcicki

Neo-Renaissance, Northern mannerism

The tenement at then Wollmarkt 14 has been designed by local architect Józef Święcicki at the end of the 19th century. The landlord at the time was Johann Adolf Hoffmann, a sausage producer (German: wurstfabrikant). In the 1910s, the building accommodated a pharmacy, Wollmarkt Apotheke, run by Dr. Rudolf Camps. Today, a tea and chocolate café is set up there.

The facade, white and brick in appearance, features a lot of architectural details. On the ground floor, two large round top windows with bossage flanks the double entry, enhanced with pilasters, pediments and a wrought iron grillwork door. The first floor is the more architecturally loaded: a balustrade runs through the level, openings are adorned with pediments, pilasters, bossage effects. The second floor displays also coat of arms cartouche. The large dormer crowning the frontage is nicely decorated with a myriad of motifs, topped by finials.

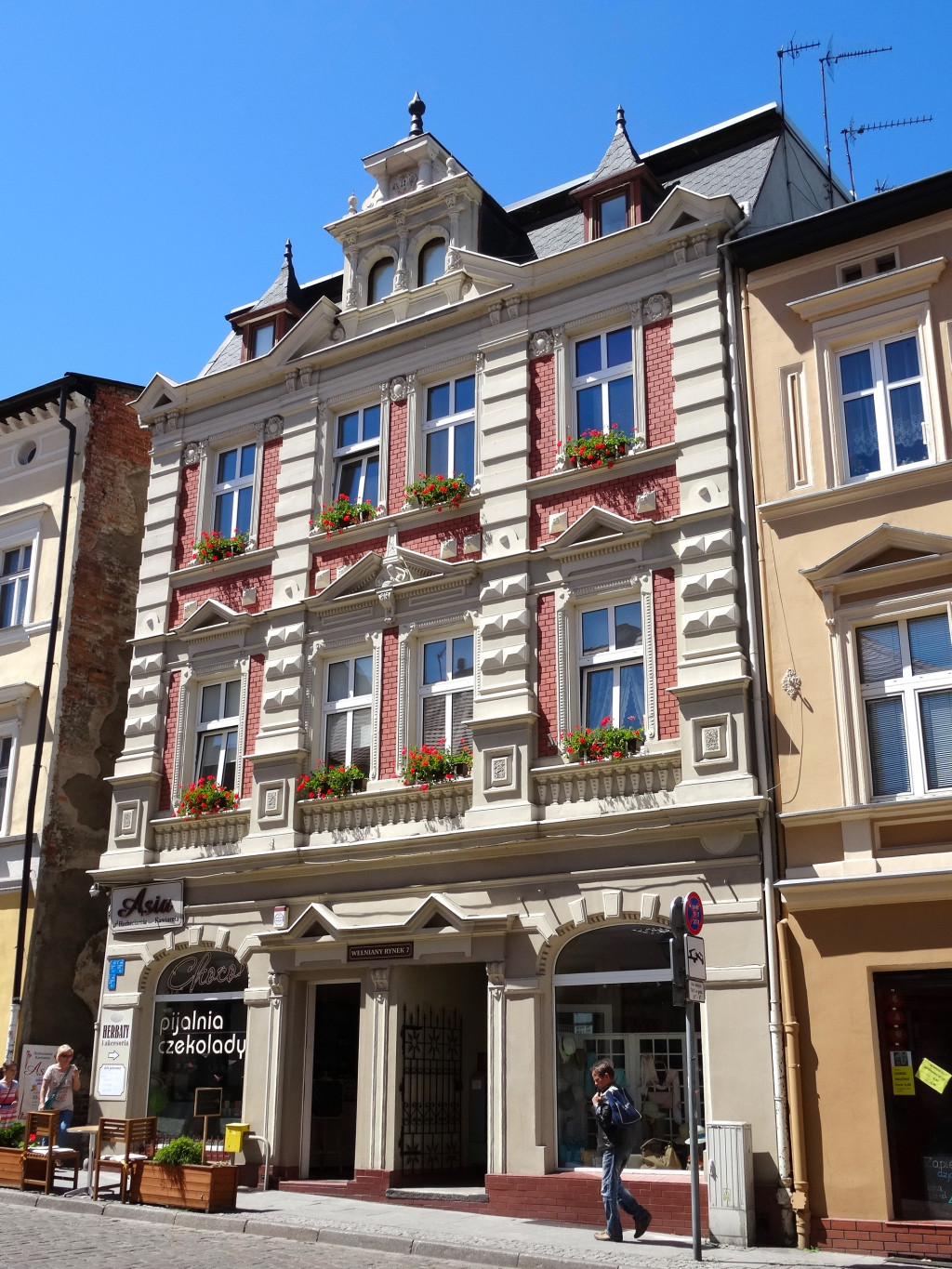
Main elevation

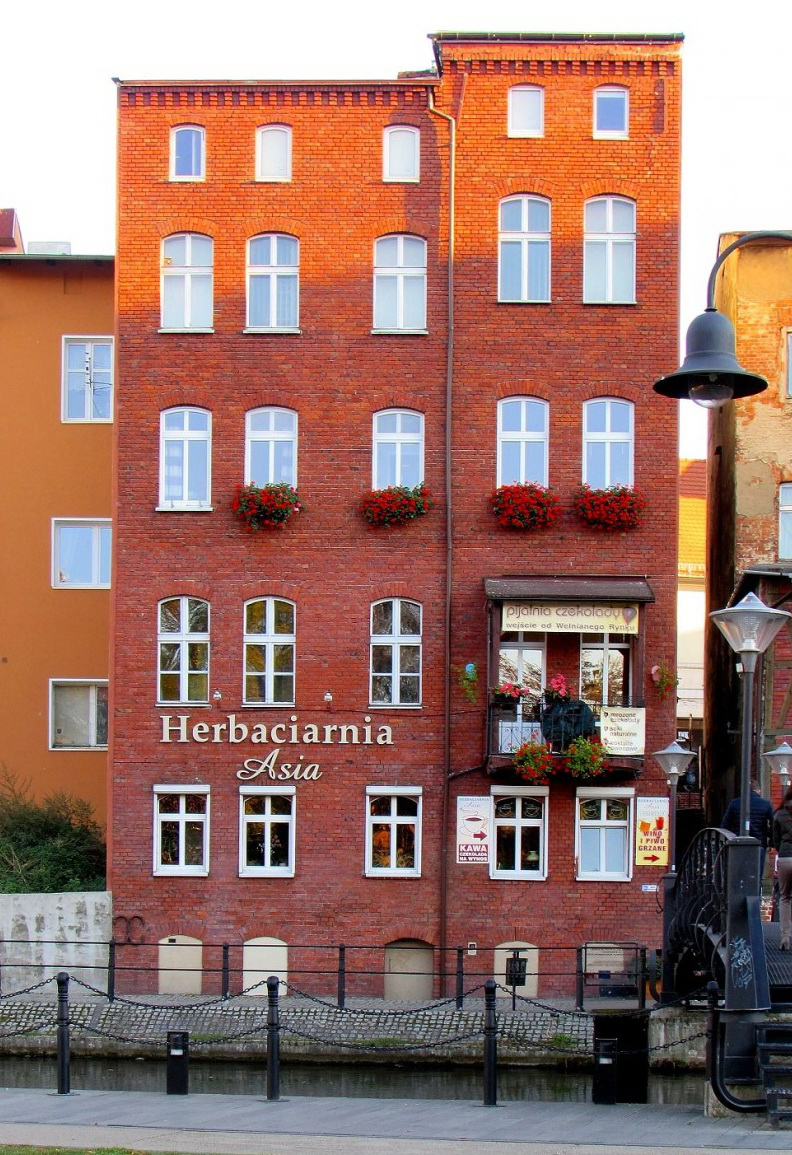
Facade on Mill Island

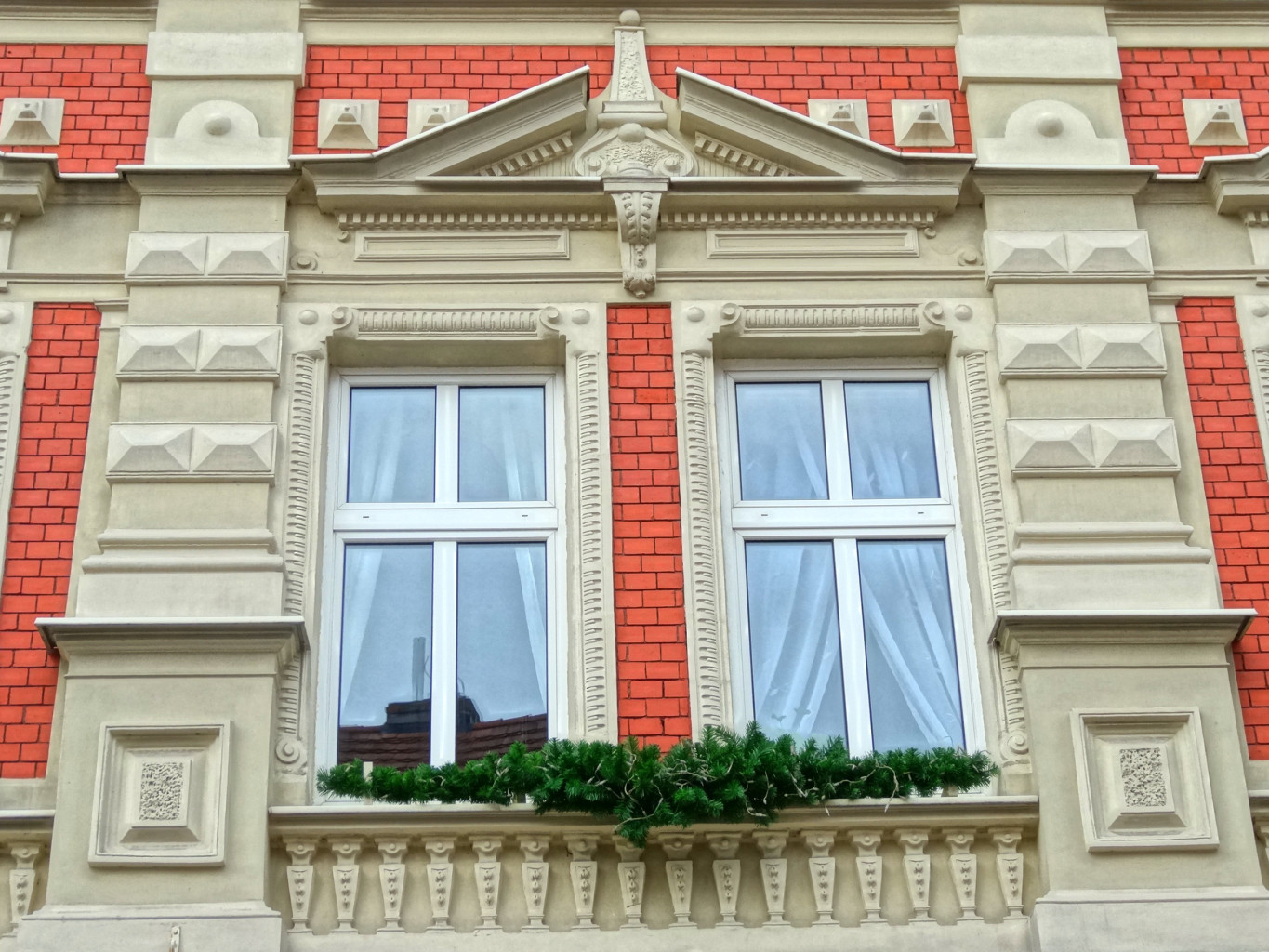
Architectural details

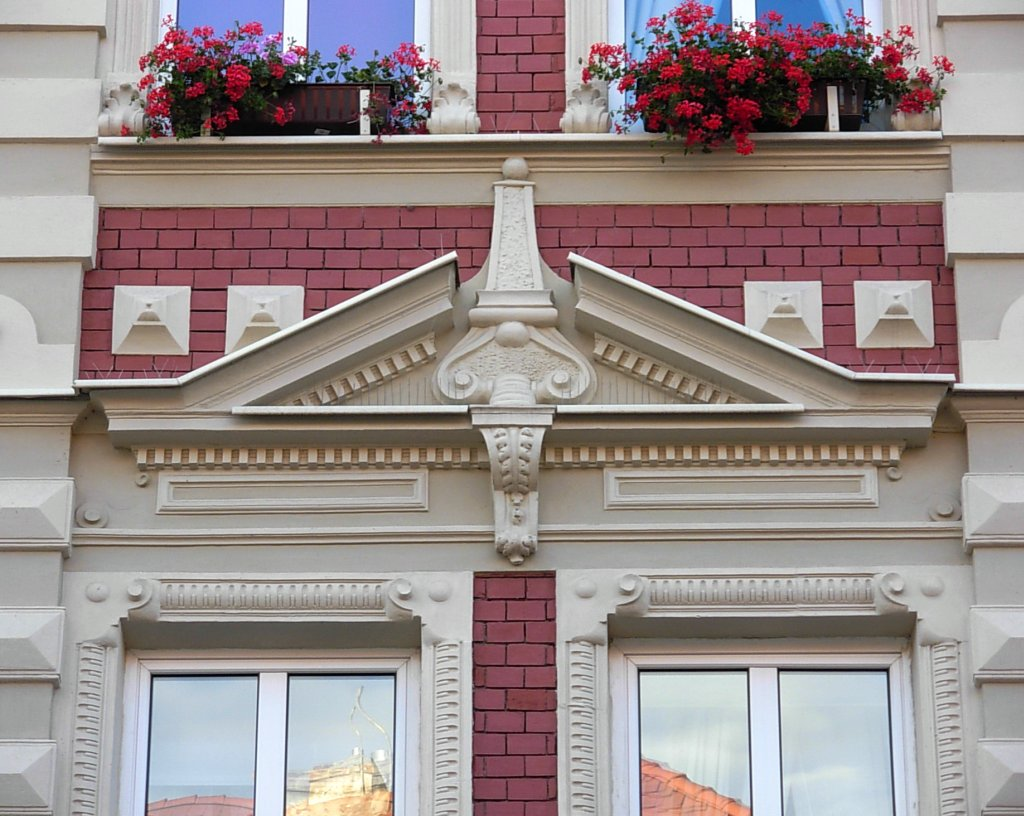
Pediment

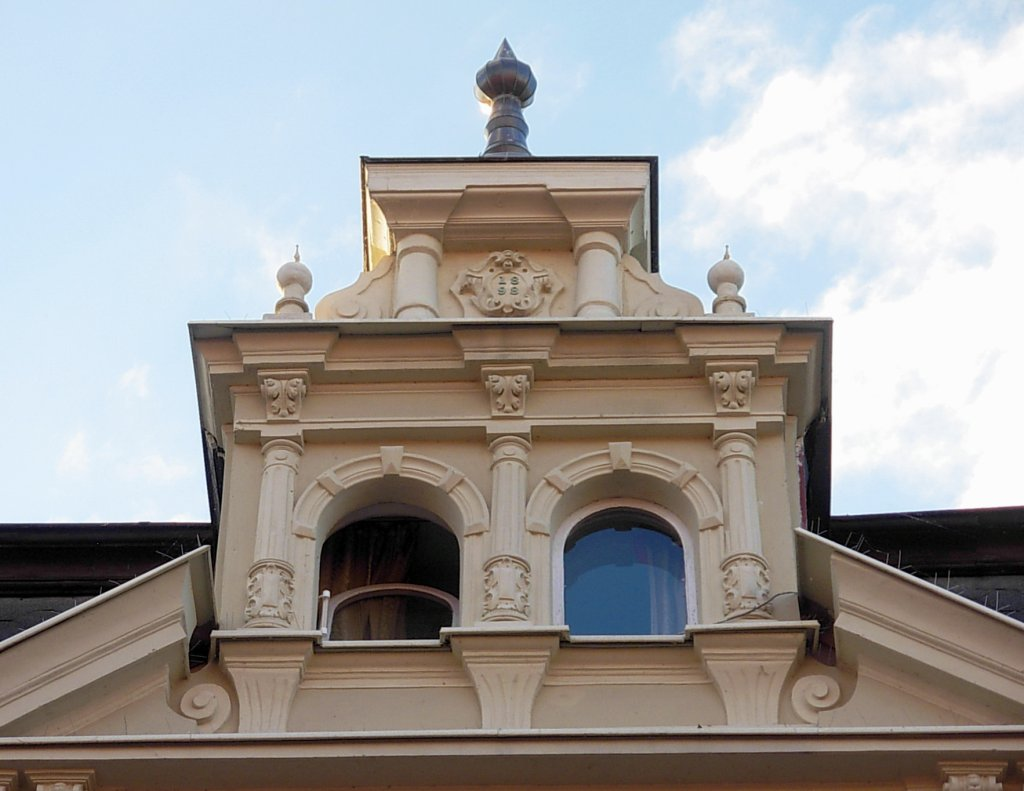
Gable top

House at 8

1800-1850

Originally, this long building was registered as Wollmarkt 1&2. Nr.1, left side of current house, has been owned by a baker, Julius Kolander, from the early 1870s till the end of Prussian period of the city (1920). Earliest recorded landlord (1869) for Nr.2 was Hermann Löwenthal, co-owner of the company F. Löwenthal's Söhne's with his brother Isidor, living on Posenerstraße (today's Poznańska street). In the 1920, both houses have been reunited as Nr.1 (German house numbering), then Nr.8 (Polish house numbering) in the 1930s. In the 1920s, there was a confectionery (Polish: cukiernia), run by Zygmunt Kunkiel. Today the building accommodates an ice cream shop, Pracownia Lodów Tradycyjnych, and a night club, Stalownia.

The facade reveals two thin eyelid dormers.

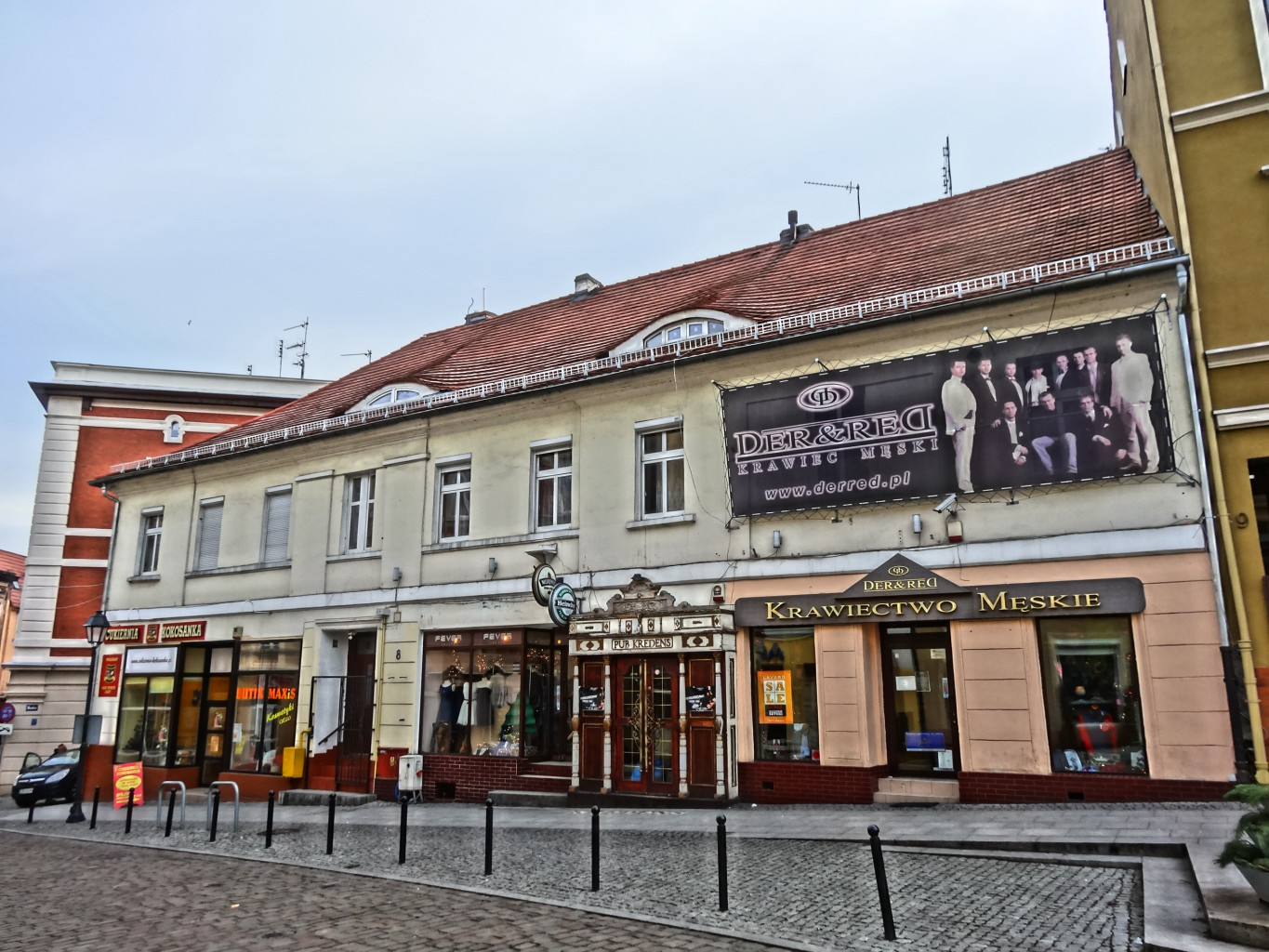
Main elevation

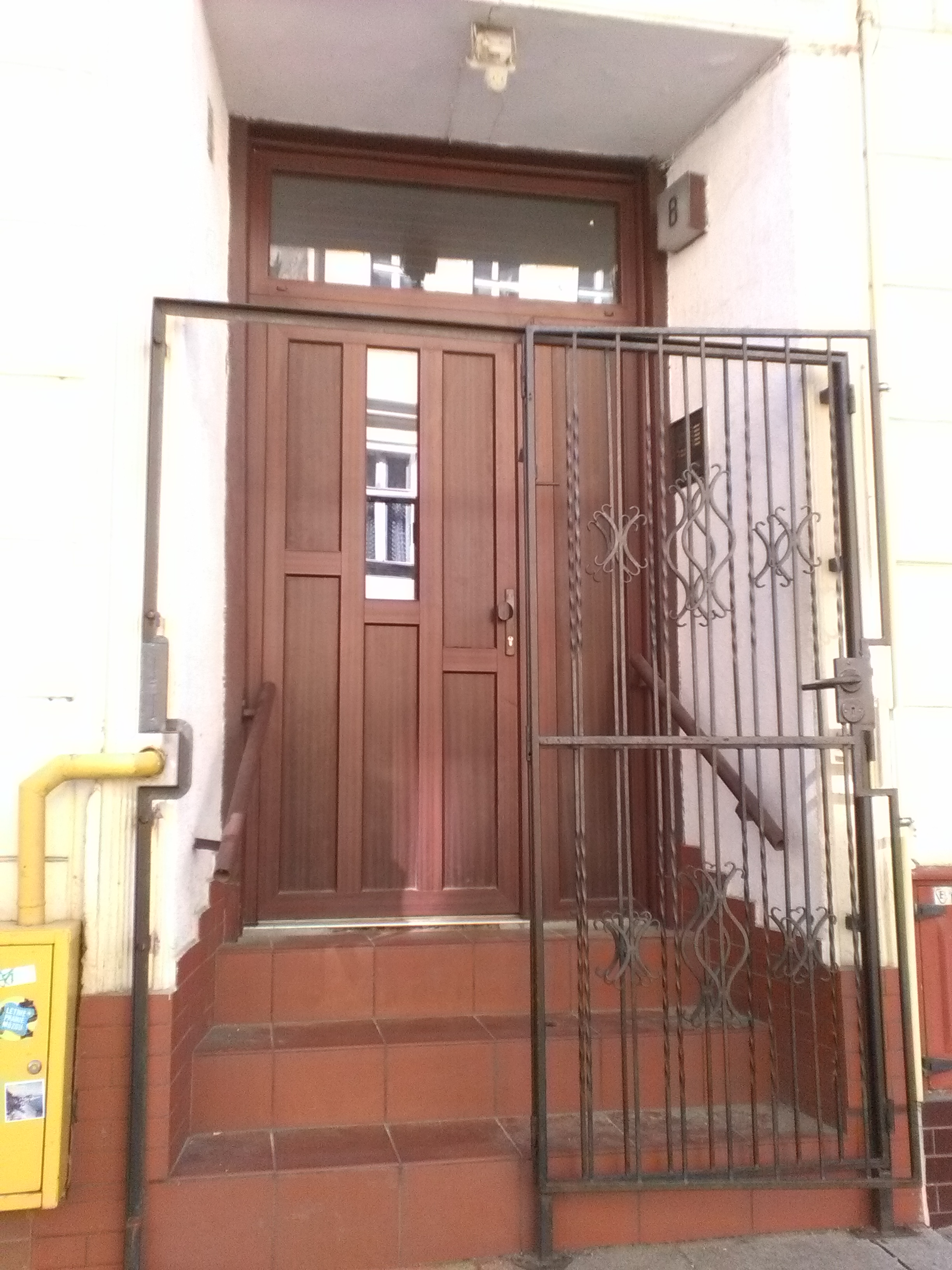
Portal

House at 9

1875-1900

Neoclassical architecture

Initially at Wollmarkt 3, its first landlord was Louis Roll, a merchant in the early 1870s. From 1880 to the end of WWI, a cabinet maker, Franz Krüger, set up there his workshop and selling office. In 1885, Władysław Piórek -today an Honorary Citizen of Bydgoszcz- had his medical practice here for few years. Thoroughly restored in the 2010s, the entire tenement is to sell to investors.

The main elevation displays plain neoclassical features.

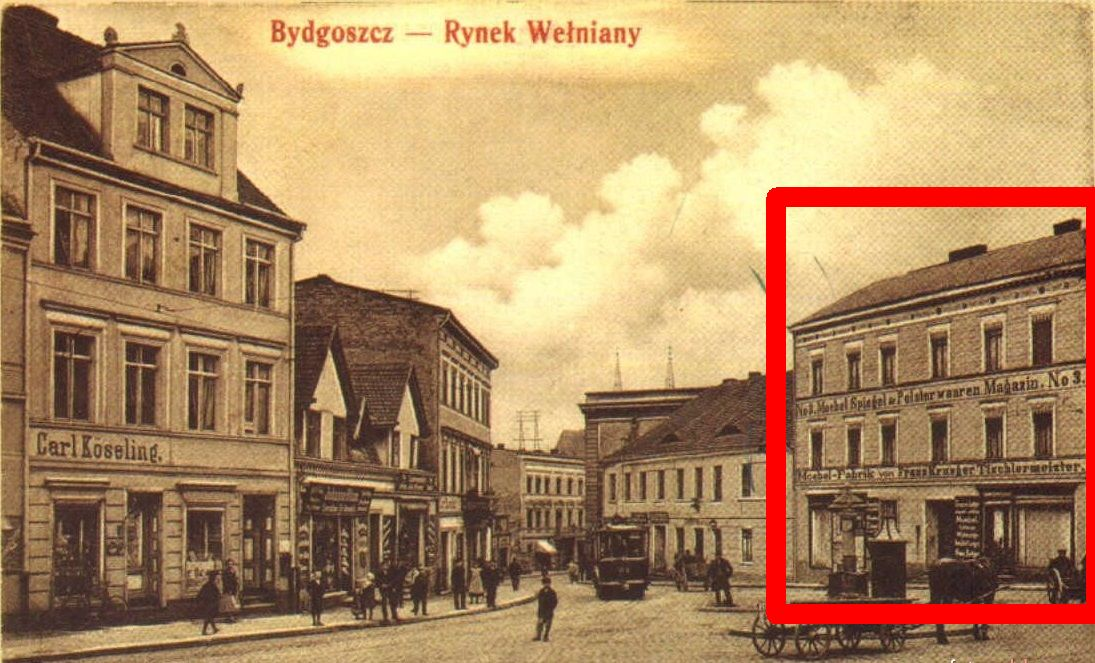
The building highlighted on a 1910 postcard

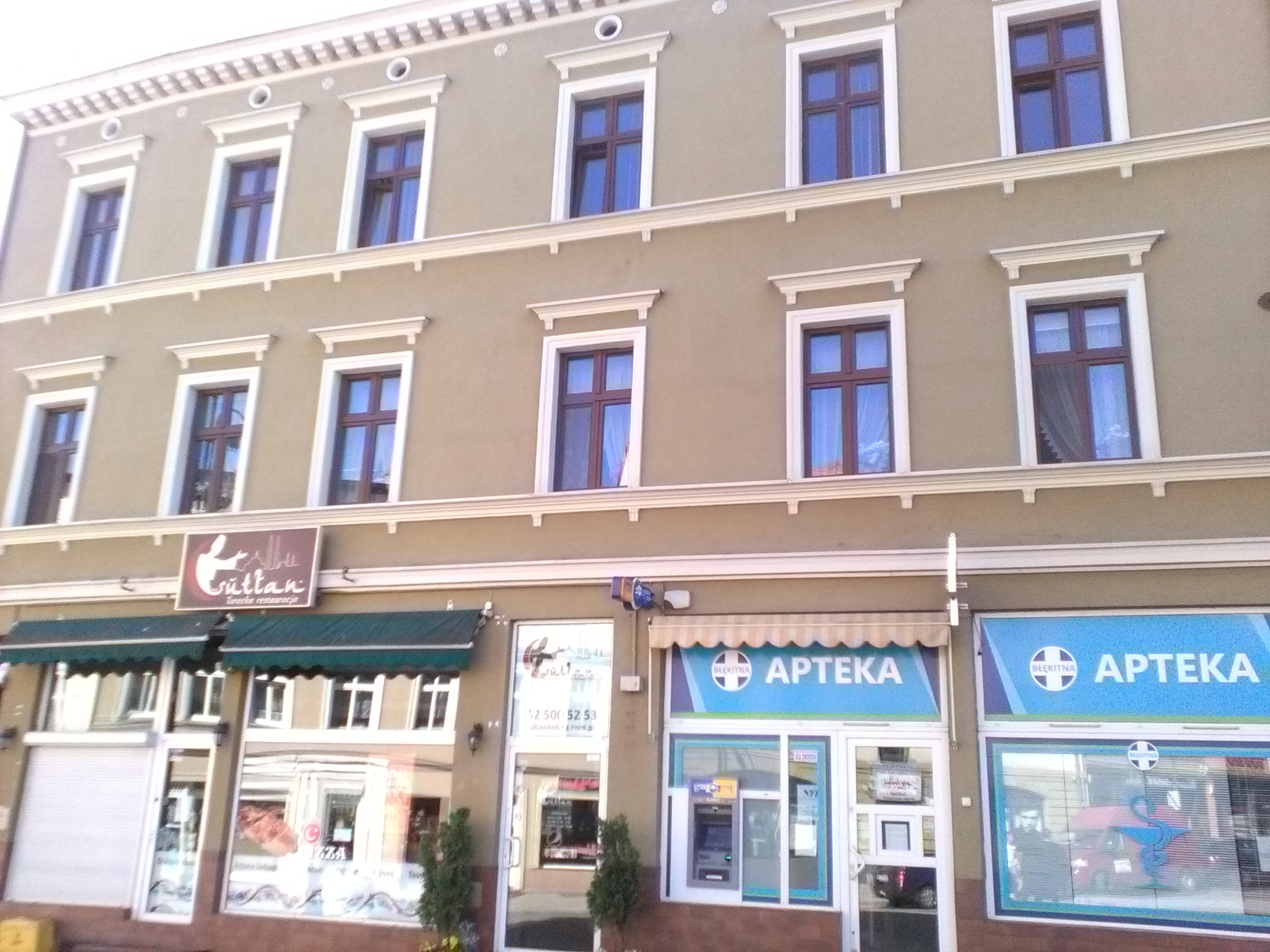
Main elevation

House at 10

1850-1875

Eclecticism

This building was first a hotel, Zum englisches House (At the English House), at Wollmarkt 4 from 1864 to 1877, run by Carl August Ritter. Afterwards, the building has been converted to an habitation tenement. Today it houses a pub, Sogo Stars. In this house lived Augustyn and Roman Träger, who played an important role during the Second World War in obtaining intelligence on the German V-1 and V-2 missiles tested in Pennemünde, on the island of Usedom (Pomerania). A plaque commemorating those heroes has been unveiled on the wall of the house in 2003.

The edifice lost its beautiful eclectic features, in particular two large wrought iron balconies that used to overhang the main entrance, and a grand Neo-Baroque pediment with urns which crowned the facade.

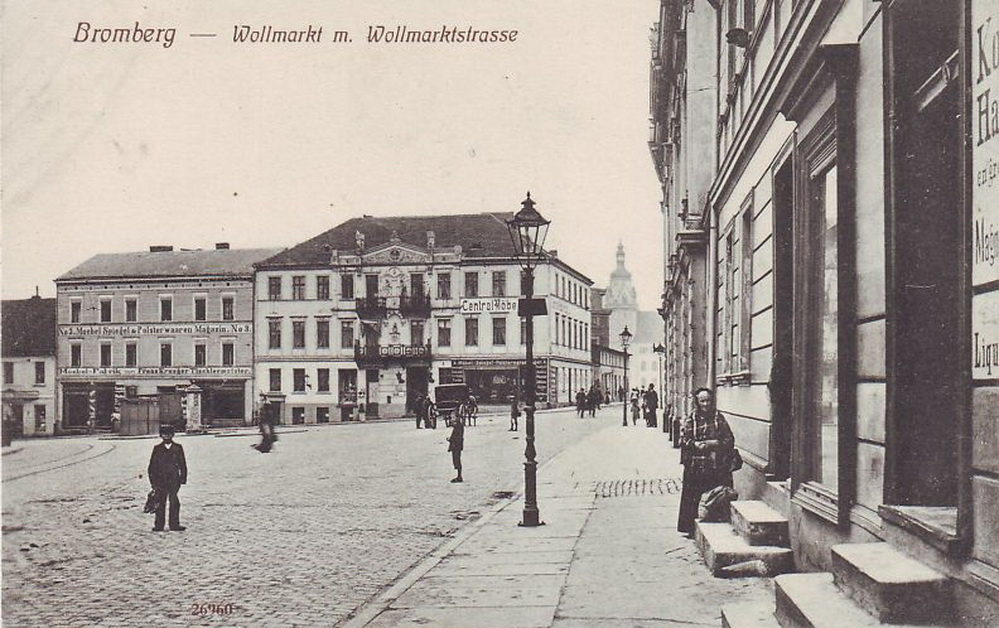
N9 (left) and N10 (right) ca 1907

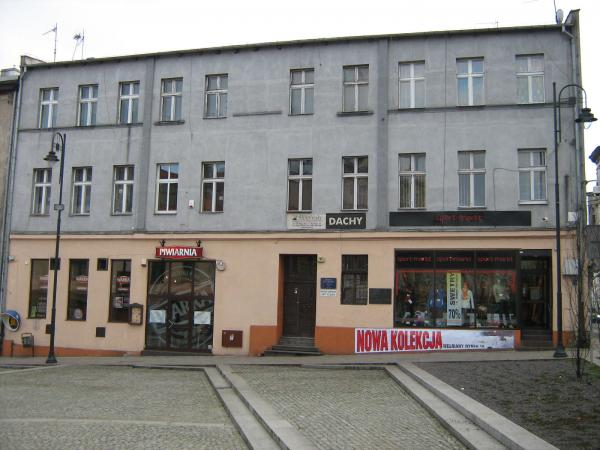
Current elevation

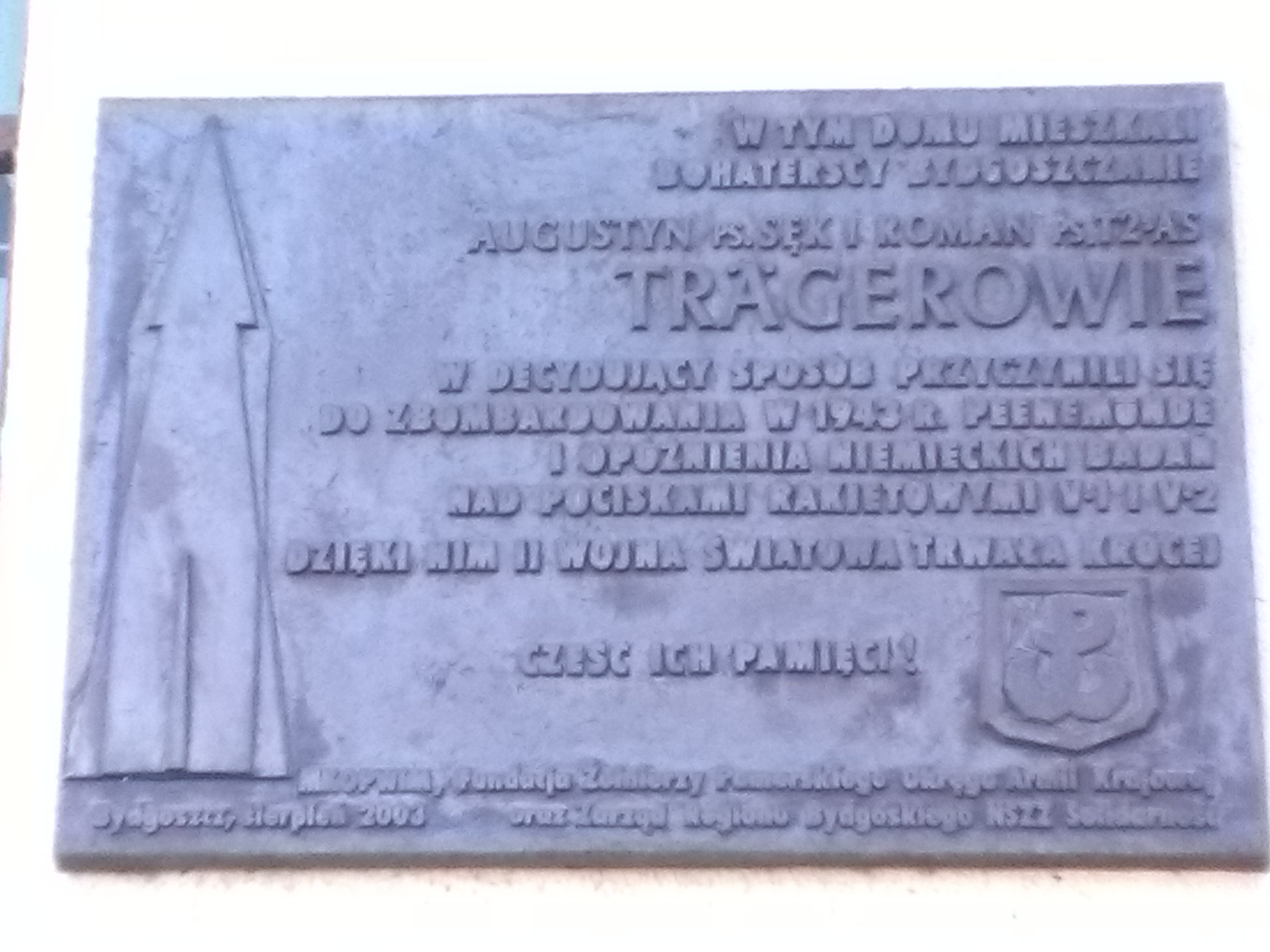
Plaque Träger

House at 11

1850–1875, by Karl Stampehl

Eclecticism

This corner tenement covered 2 addresses at its inception, Wollmarkt 5 and Wollmarkt 6. The house at Wollmarkt 5 has been first owned by a baker, Heinrich Affeldt, in the beginning of the 1860s. House at Wollmarkt 6 had Carl Volpius, a locksmith, as first landlord in the early 1850s. In 1883, both numbers (5&6) were united as one habitation house owned by Heinrich Affeldt. At the turn of the 20th century, Wilhelm Weiß, a merchant, took over the ownership of the tenement, which he kept till the outbreak of the Second World War. Since the beginning of 2017, the ground floor hosts a virtual gaming salon, Cyber Machina.

The tenement still retains nice architectural details. Windows on the first floor boast worked window sills and crossheads encapsulating a winged motif. Openings on the third floor are each separated by one large ornament. At the top of the facade runs a dentil. Highlight of this building is the presence in the corner of a round bay window stretching through two levels. A cartouche above a first floor window still bears the "A" initial from the first landlord Affeldt.

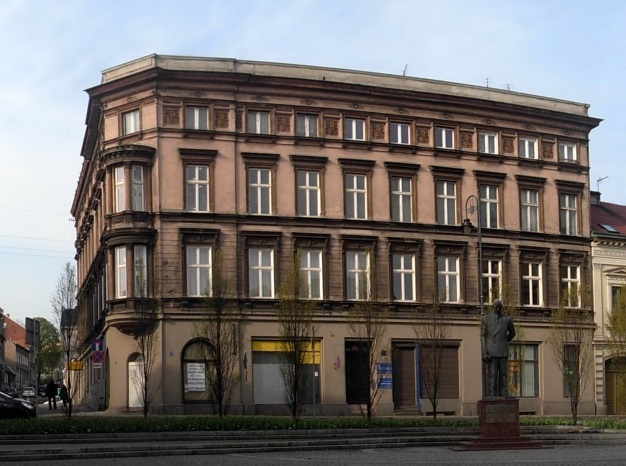
Main elevation on the square

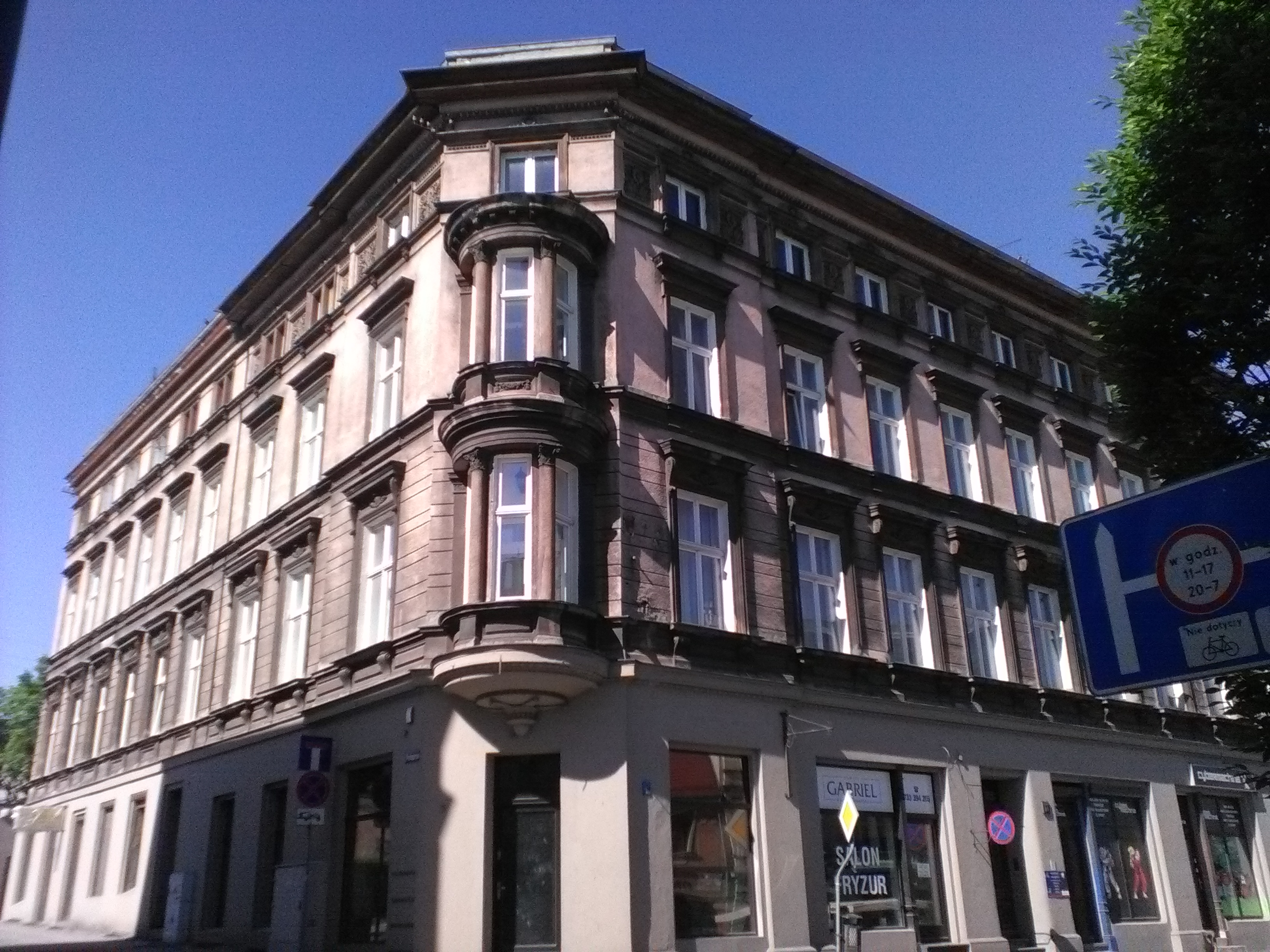
Corner view

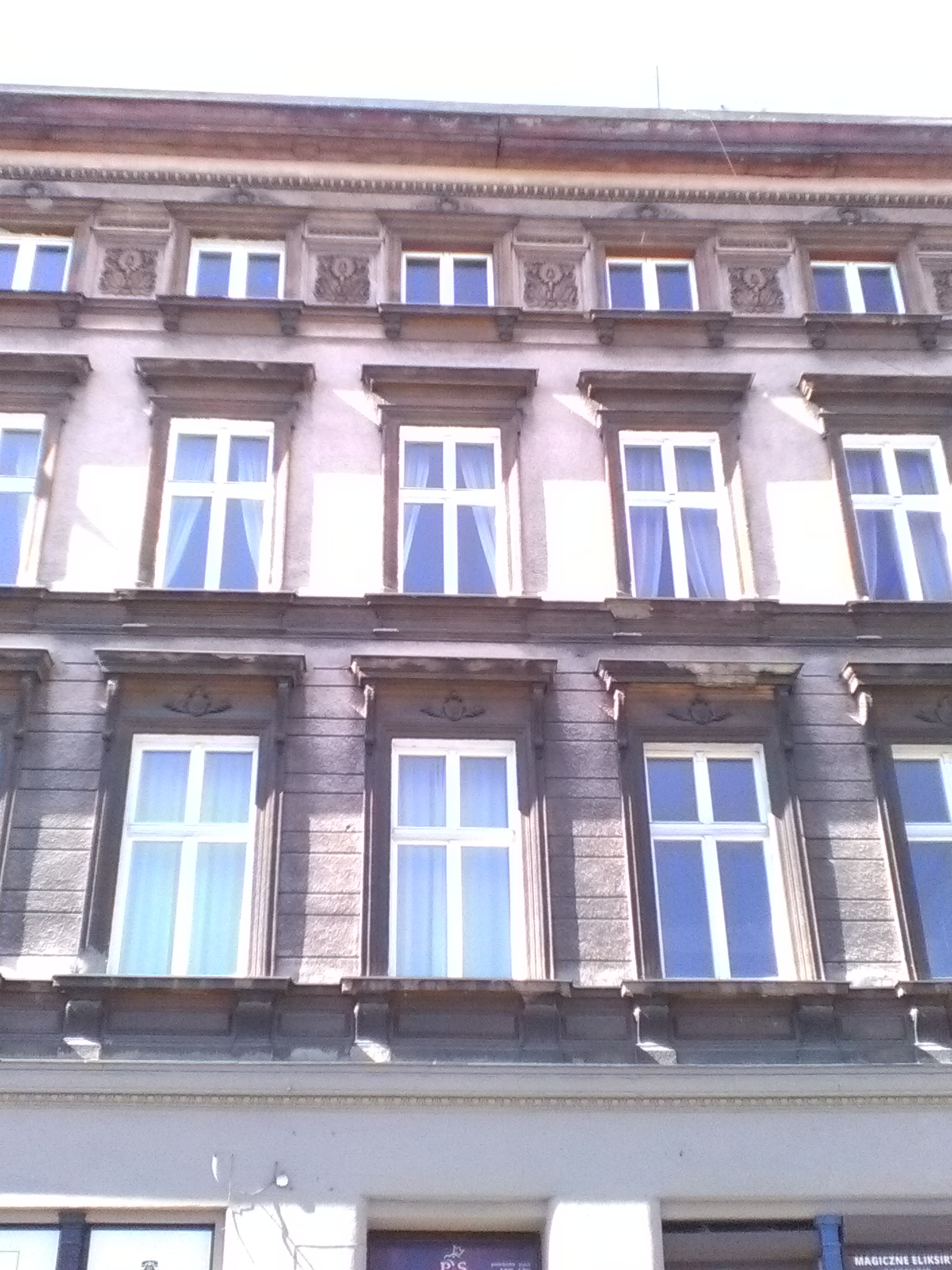
Facade Detail

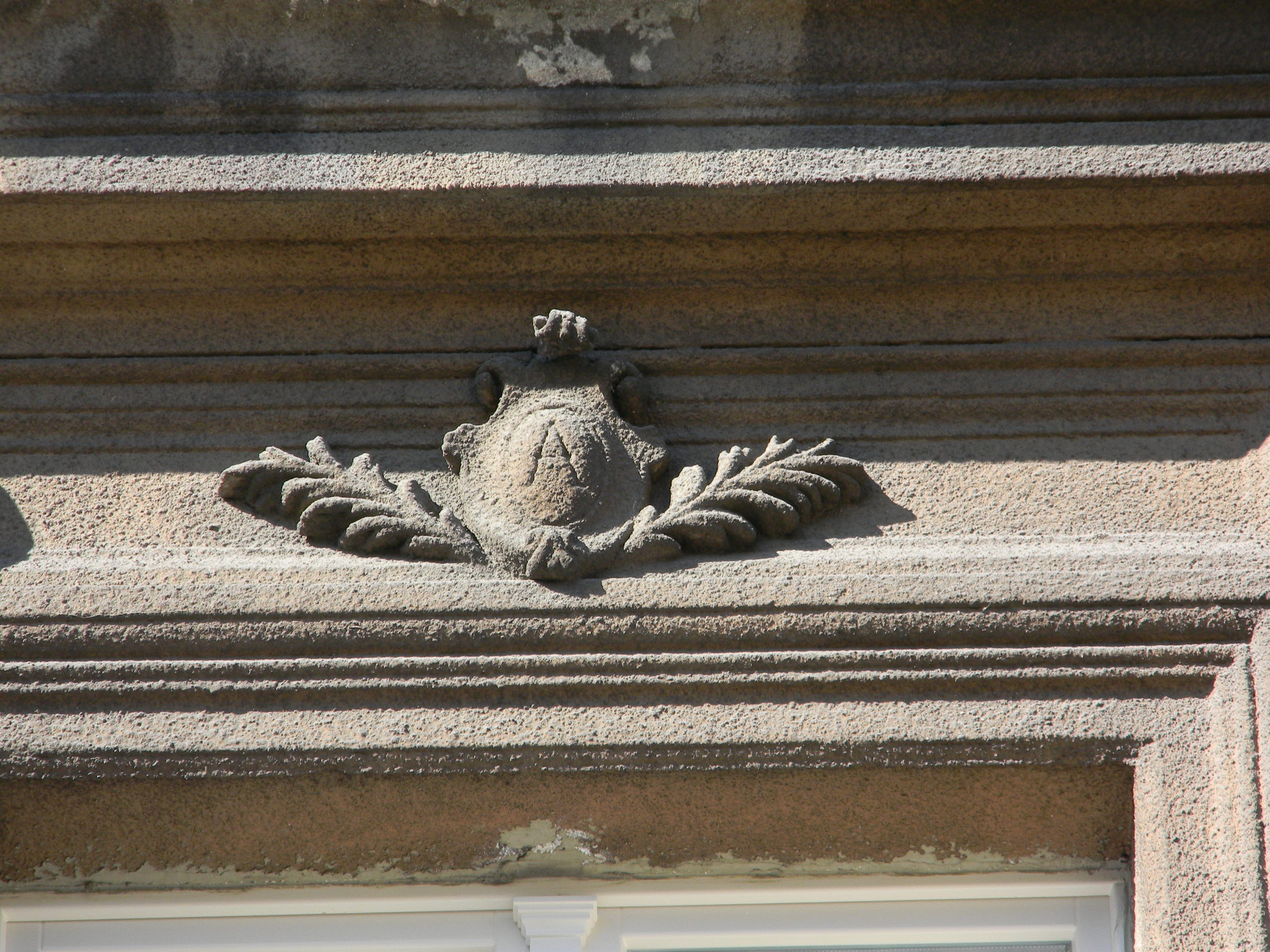
Detail of the cartouche with the "A" initial engraved

Bromberger Bank House at 12

1800-1850

Neoclassical architecture

The building, at then Wollmarkt 7, has been housing banking activities soon after erection. Initially it accommodated Dagobert Friendländler, a banker, then Martin Friendänder, city counselor and banker, head of Bank M. Friendländer Beck and Co, which had also shareholdings in the thriving print house Grünauer located at today's Gdańska Street 6/8. At the start of the 20th century, it has been the seat of the Bromberger Bank, till 1910.

The house displays an unbalanced facade onto the square. Ground floor boasts bossage and a carriage entrance on the right. Main entrance is underlined with a light avant-corps, highlighting a pedimented window flanked by pilasters on the first floor: ensemble is crowned with a large triangular pediment bearing a stylized female figure in the tympanum. All openings have adorned window sills and crossheads. A corbel table runs at the top of the frontage.

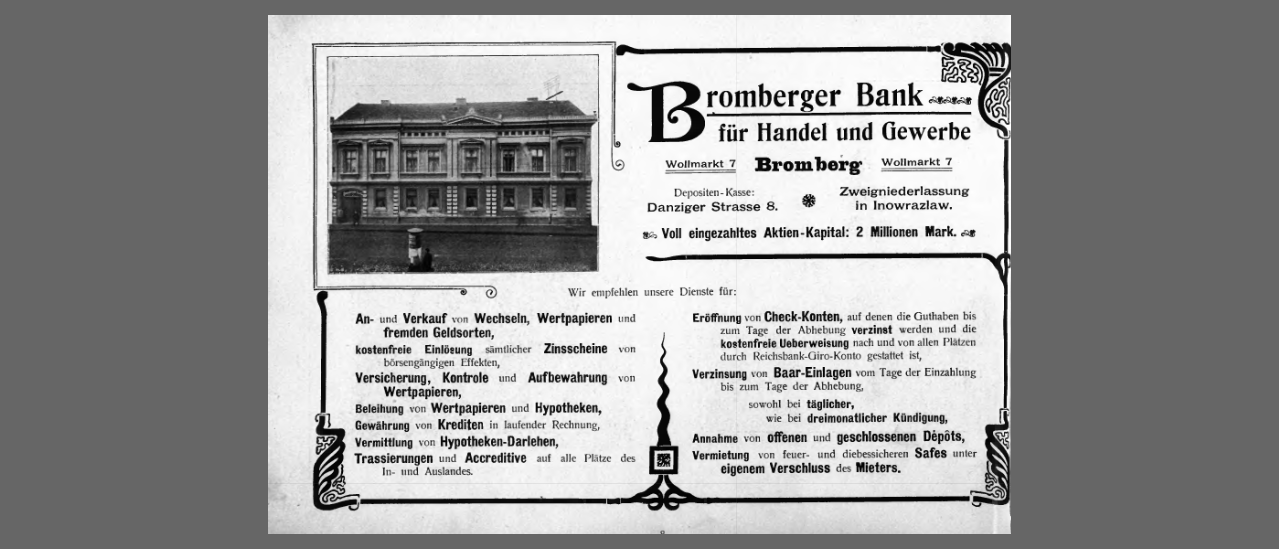
Advertising for Bromberger Bank, ca 1900

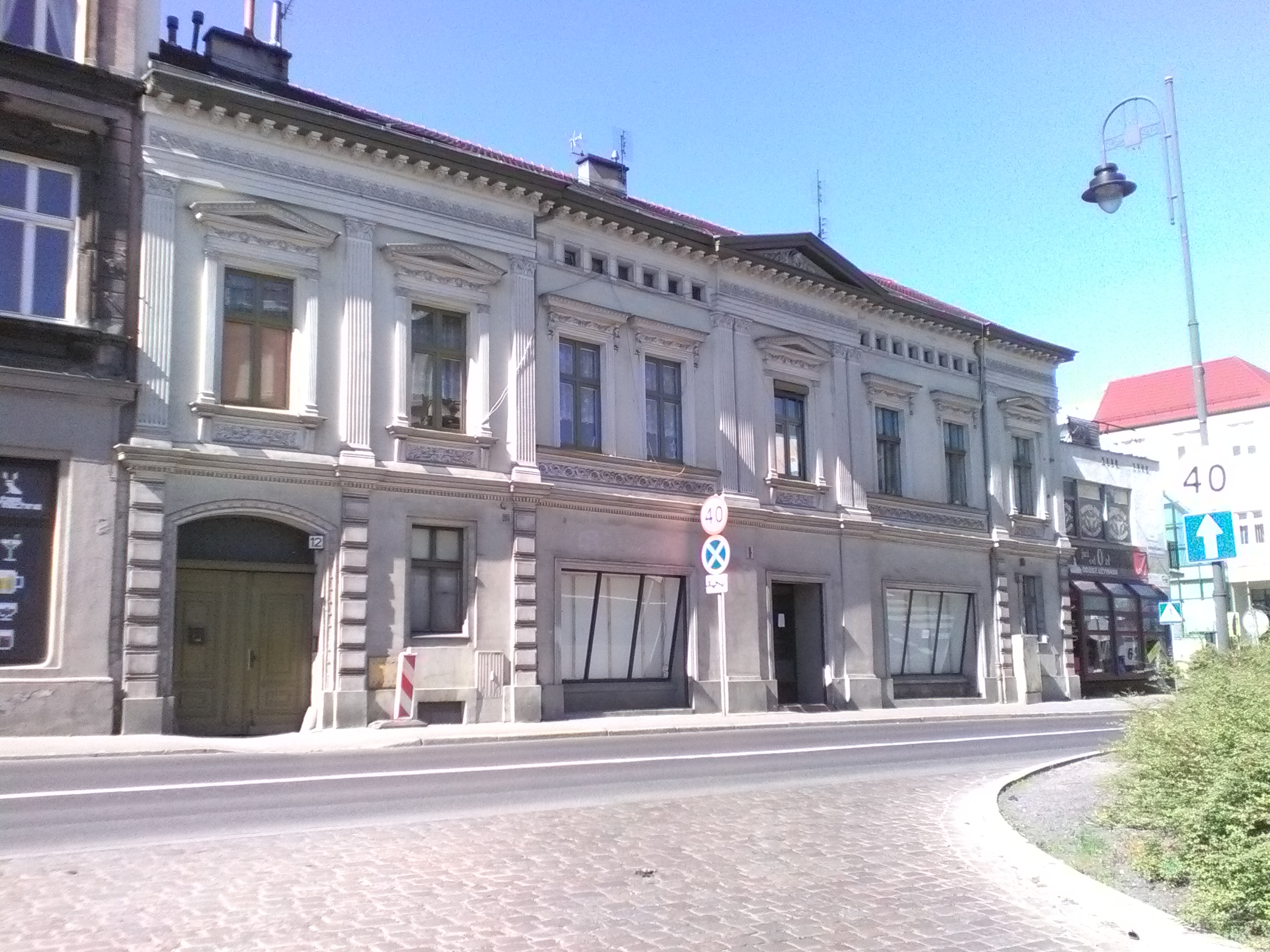
Facade onto the square

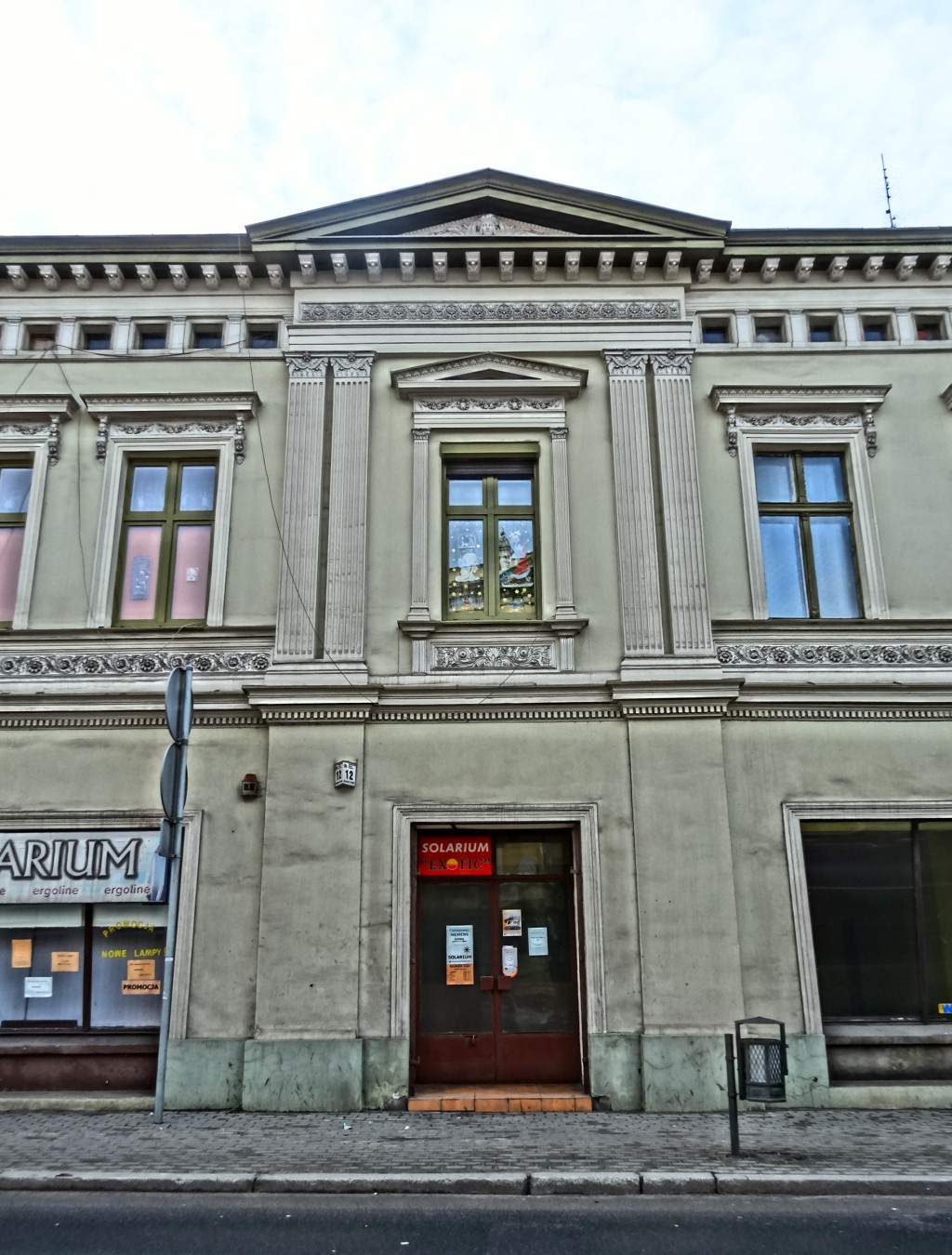
Main entrance

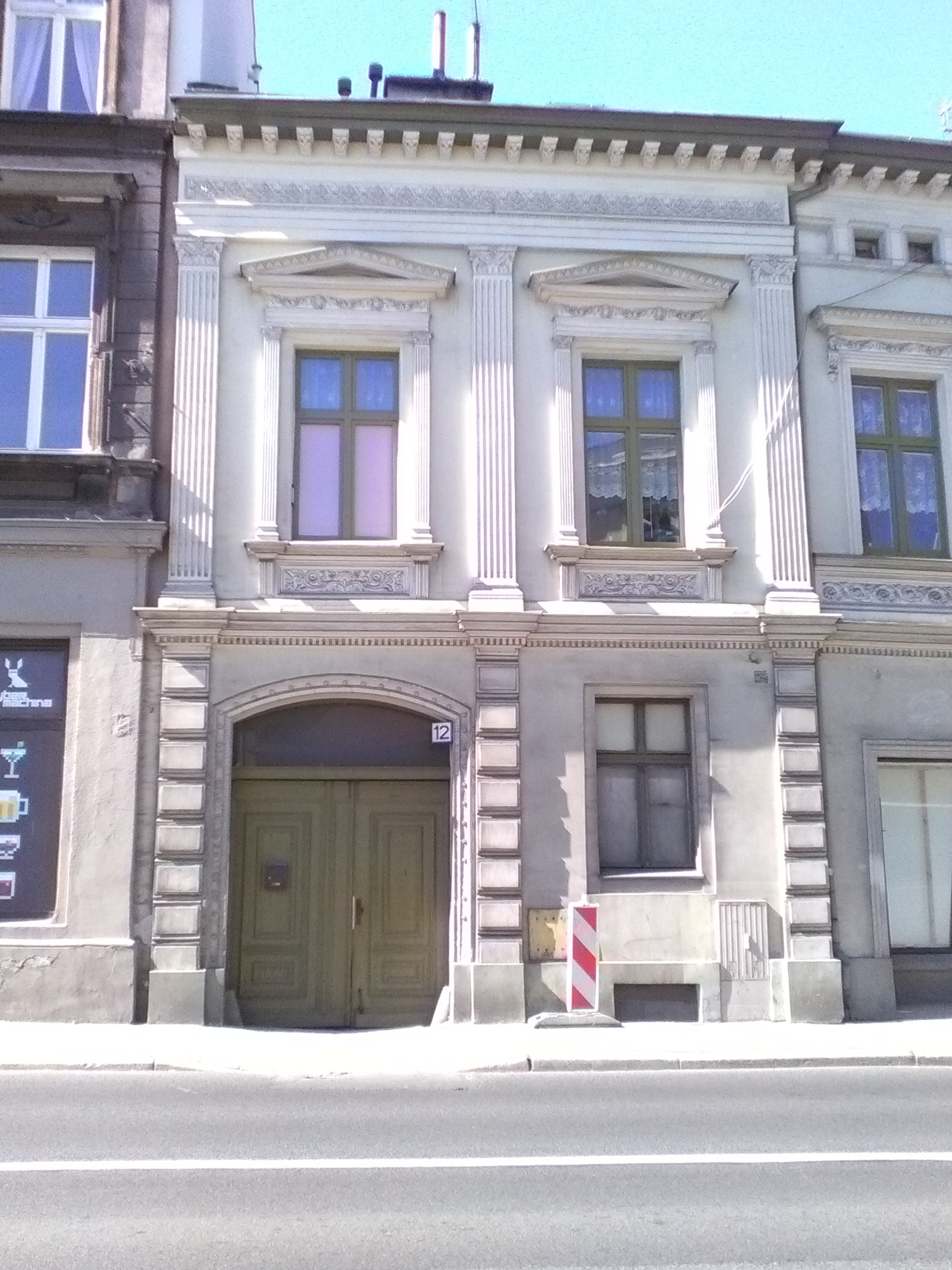
Right side of the building

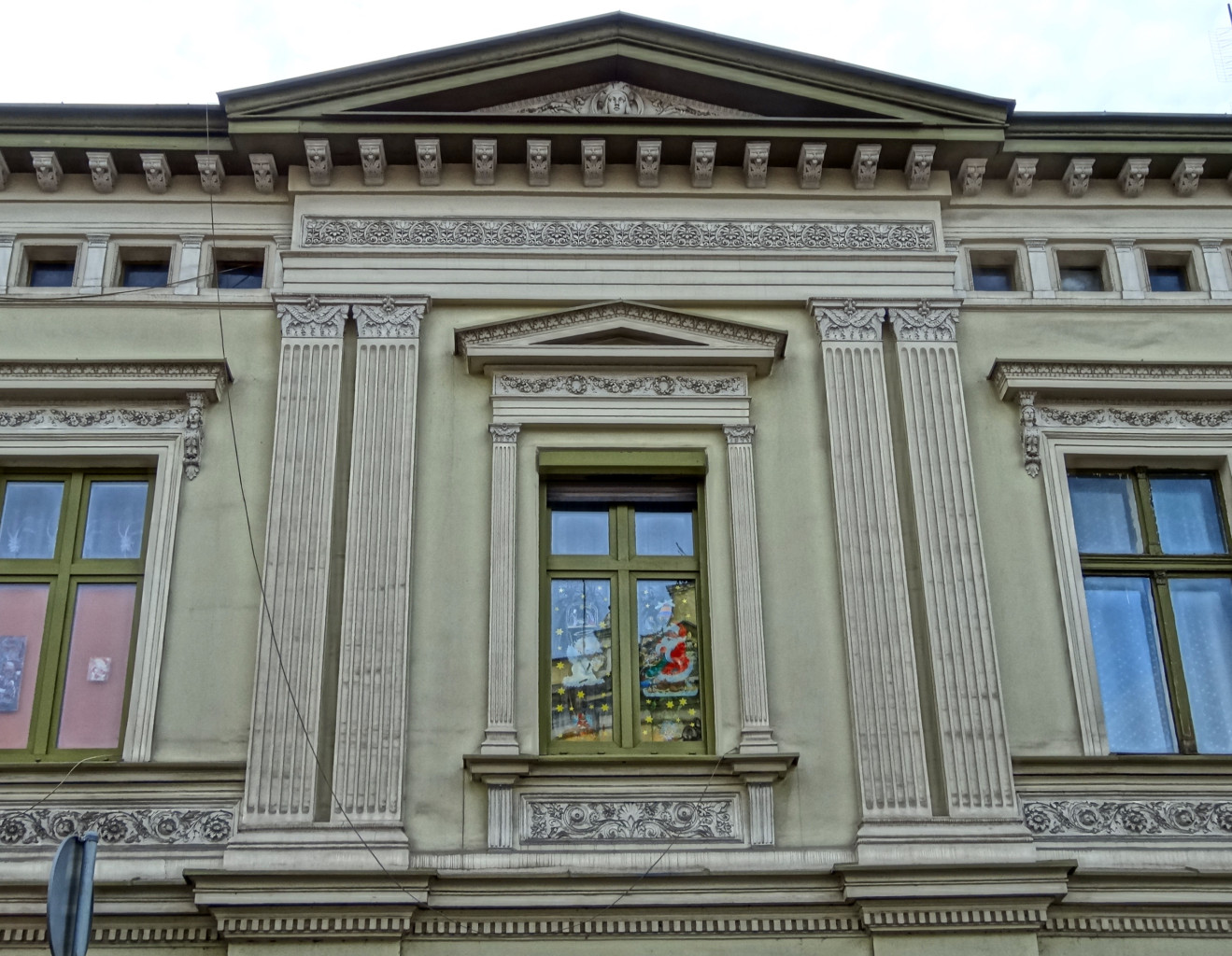
Details of the architectural motifs

Statue to Leon Barciszewski

Leon Barciszewski was mayor (Polish: prezydent) of Gniezno(1925–1932) and Bydgoszcz (1932–1939): he was murdered by the Nazis, together with his son on November 11, 1939.

After the end of World War II, communist authorities opposed any intent to celebrate the memory of the pre-war mayor, declining even the naming of a street despite long-term efforts. A committee for the construction of a monument to Leon Barciszewski was established on January 14, 1981, at the initiative of Solidarność Union. Its members were engineers Zbigniew Woźniak, Aleksander Kaszowski, Irena Horbulewicz and Józef Podgóreczny, Henryk Kulpiński, Józef Werno, Anna Drożniakiewicz, Andrzej Kowalski, Grażyna Kasprzak, Marek Guczalski, Olaf Bitte. It was planned to set up the monument on Theatre square. In 1981, social contributions began to be collected. With the introduction of martial law in July 1981, the initiative was paused and only resumed in the second half of the 1980s. Eventually, total funds were gathered with the help of city residents, the Ministry of Culture and Art and the City Hall. Sculptor Sławoj Ostrowski designed the statue, and bronze casting was performed for a symbolic remuneration by a team from the Gdynia Navy Shipyard under the supervision of engineer Bandrowski.

The unveiling of the monument took place on November 11, 1989, Polish National Independence Day and concurrently the 50th anniversary of Leon Barciszewski's murder. It then stood on the square between the Brda river and 1 Grodzka Street: the ceremony was chaired by Bydgoszcz mayor, Władysław Przybylski, and Leon Barciszewski's daughter, Danuta Barciszewska-Borkowska, after a solemn service at the cathedral led by Bishop Jan Wiktor Nowak. In 2007, Bydgoszcz municipality moved the monument to the newly renovated Wool Market square.

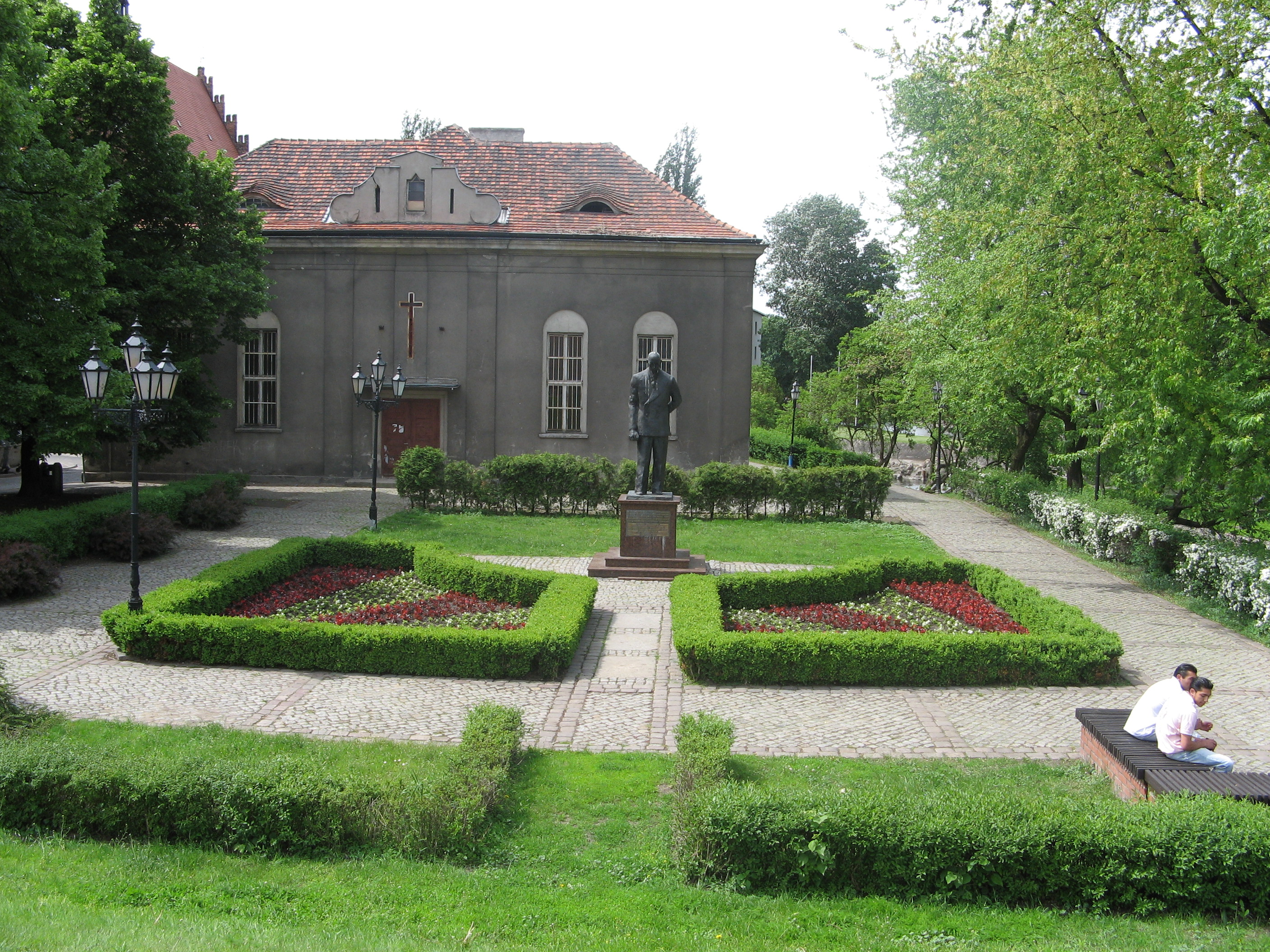
The statue at its initial location

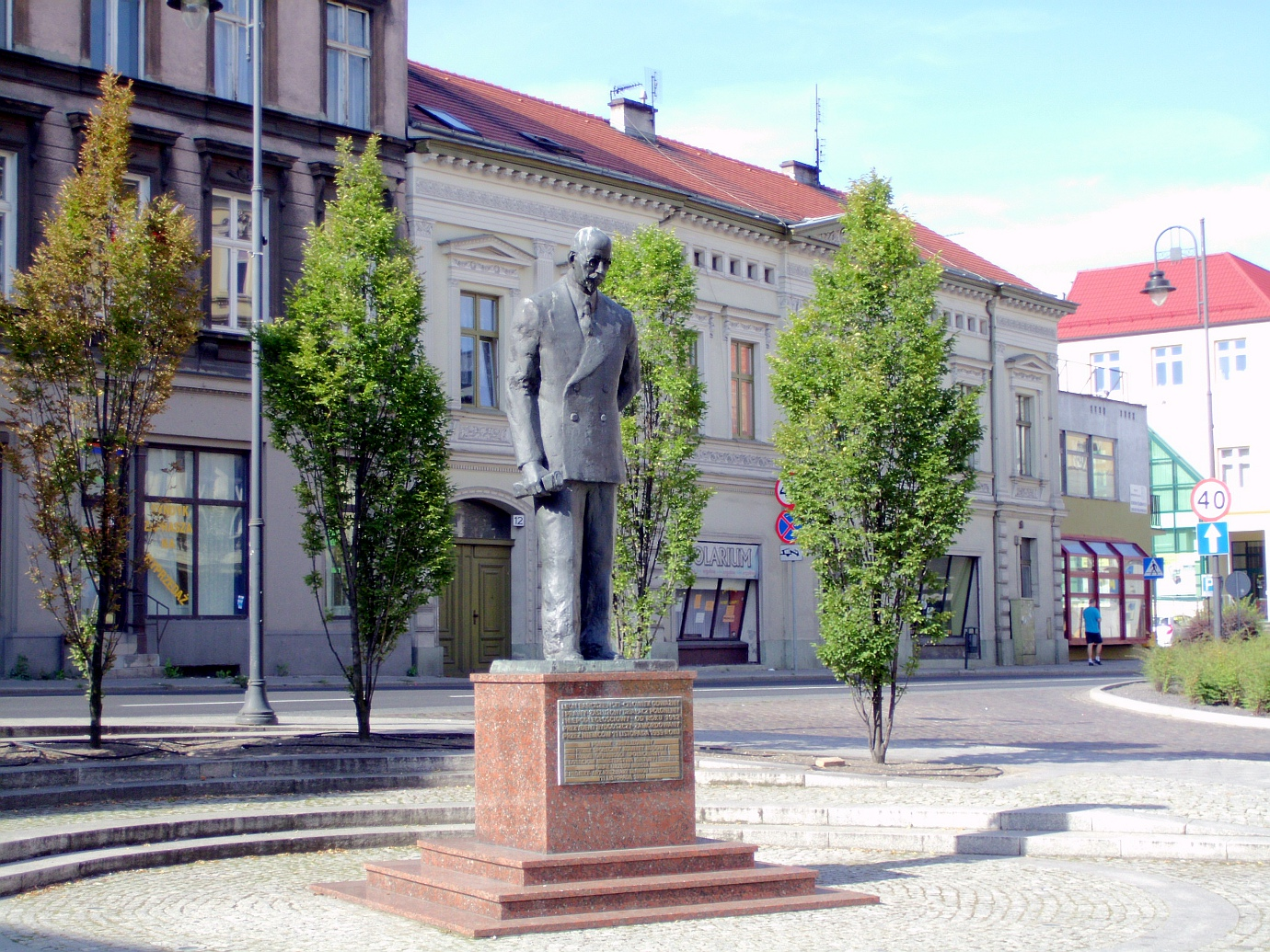
Current view from Wool Market square

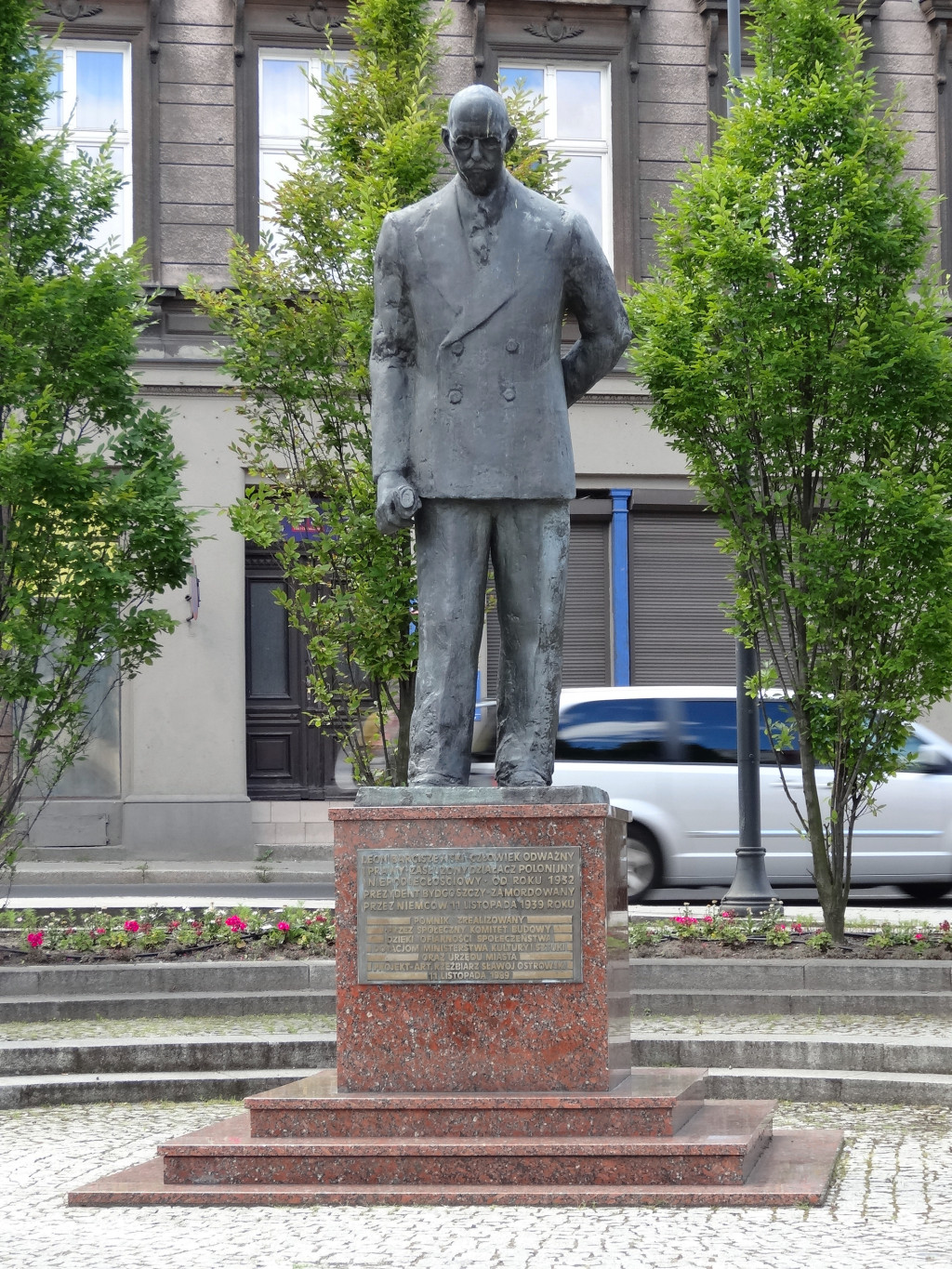
Detailed view

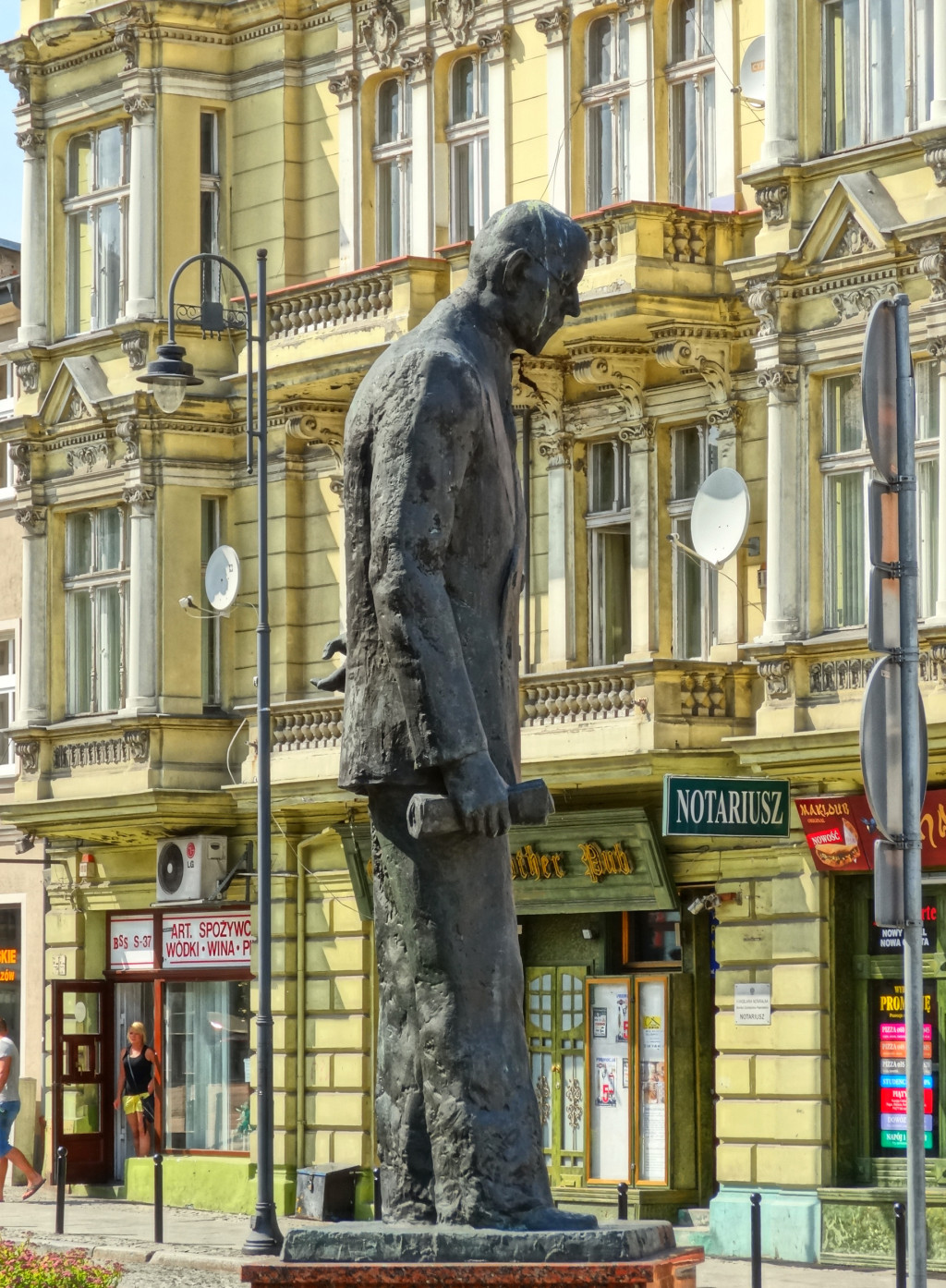
Wilhelm Kopp's Tenement in the backdrop

== See also ==
- Bydgoszcz
- Józef Święcicki
- Bydgoszcz Architects (1850-1970s)
- Roman Träger
- Augustyn Träger
- Władysław Piórek

== Bibliography ==
- (in Polish) Derenda, Jerzy (2006). Piękna stara Bydgoszcz – tom I z serii Bydgoszcz miasto na Kujawach. Bydgoszcz: Towarzystwo Miłośników Miasta Bydgoszczy.
- (in Polish) Umiński, Janusz (1996). Bydgoszcz. Przewodnik. Bydgoszcz: Regionalny Oddział PTTK „Szlak Brdy”.
