= Traeger =

Traeger or Träger (German for "carrier") is a German surname. Notable people with the surname include:

- Albert Traeger (1830–1912), German politician
- Alfred Traeger (1895–1980), Australian inventor of the pedal wireless
- Augustyn Träger (1896–1957), Polish-Austrian soldier during World War I and intelligence officer
- Carsten Träger (1973–2026), German politician
- Elinor Meissner Traeger (1906–1983), American composer, pianist, and writer
- Ernst Träger (1926–2015), German judge
- Jake Traeger (born 1980), American soccer player
- John E. Traeger (1859–1946), American politician
- Roman Träger (1923–1987), Polish soldier and intelligence officer, son of Augustyn
- Ronald Traeger (1936–1968), American fashion photographer
- Tessa Traeger (born 1938), British photographer
- William Isham Traeger (1880–1935), Sheriff of Los Angeles County

Fictional characters:

- Chris Traeger, in the sitcom Parks and Recreation

== See also ==
- Treger (disambiguation)
- Traeger Park
- Trager
