= Nowofarny Cemetery in Bydgoszcz =

Urban catholic cemetery, 20th century, Bydgoszcz, Poland

Nowofarny cemetery in Bydgoszcz
- Cmentarz Nowofarny w Bydgoszczy
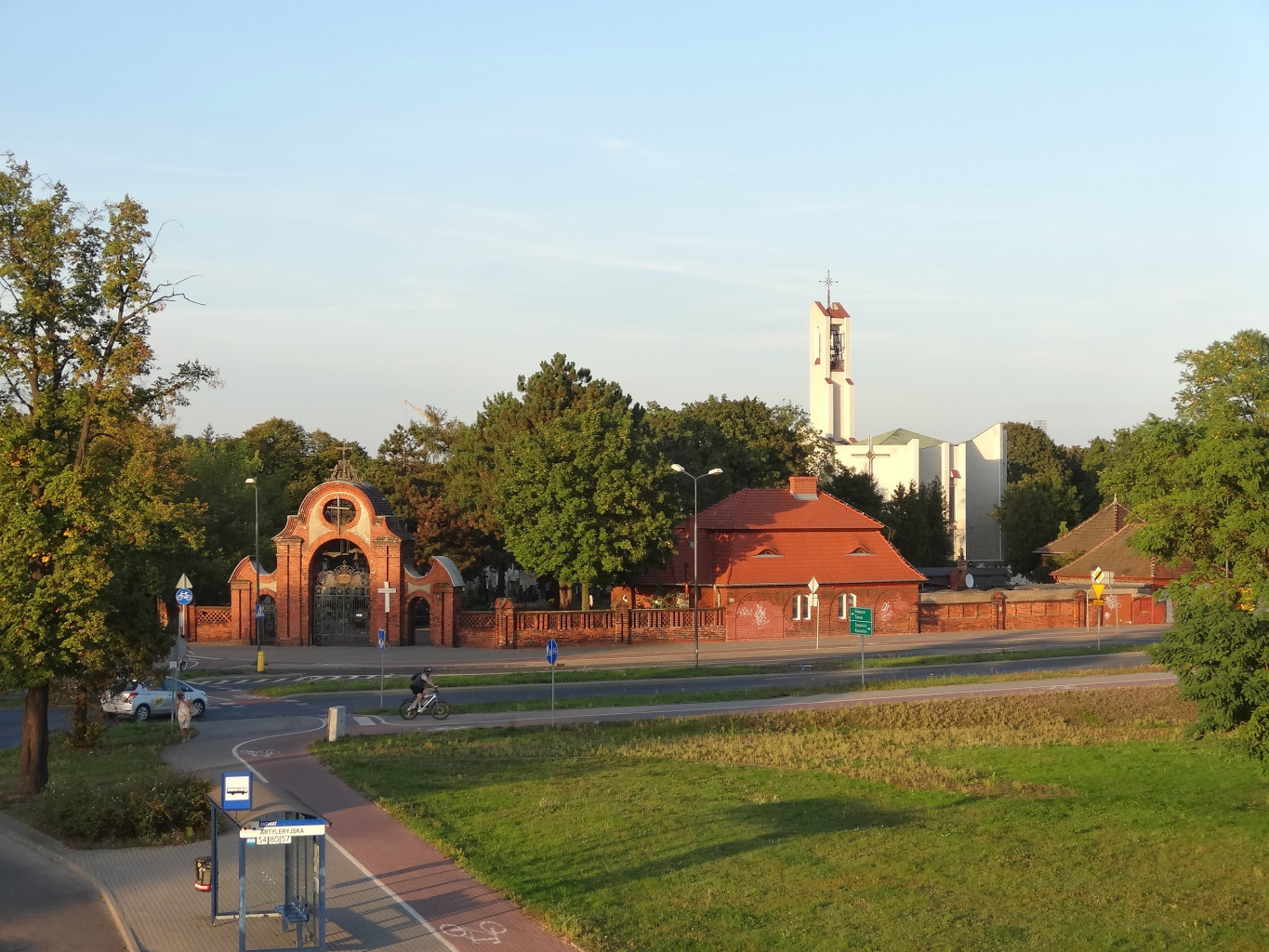
- Main entrance gate and church of the Holy Cross
- Interactive map of Nowofarny cemetery in Bydgoszcz

Details
- Established: 1906
- Location: Bydgoszcz
- Country: Poland
- Coordinates: 53°08′25″N 18°00′16″E
- Type: Public
- Owned by: City of Bydgoszcz
- Size: 11.9 hectares (29 acres)
- Website: Parish site

The Nowofarny cemetery in Bydgoszcz is one of the largest Roman Catholic cemeteries in this Polish city. One of its oldest area has been registered on the Kuyavian-Pomeranian Voivodeship Heritage List.

== Location ==
The cemetery is located in the northern part of Bydgoszcz, between the following streets: Artyleryjska, Zaświat, Powstańców Warszawy, and Skromna.

To the east, it is adjacent to the military and municipal cemetery, where stand a monument and tombstones of Red Army fallen soldiers, and graves of state activists from the PRL. To the north, the site borders with an Evangelical-Augsburg Cemetery, registered on the Voivodeship Heritage List.

== History ==
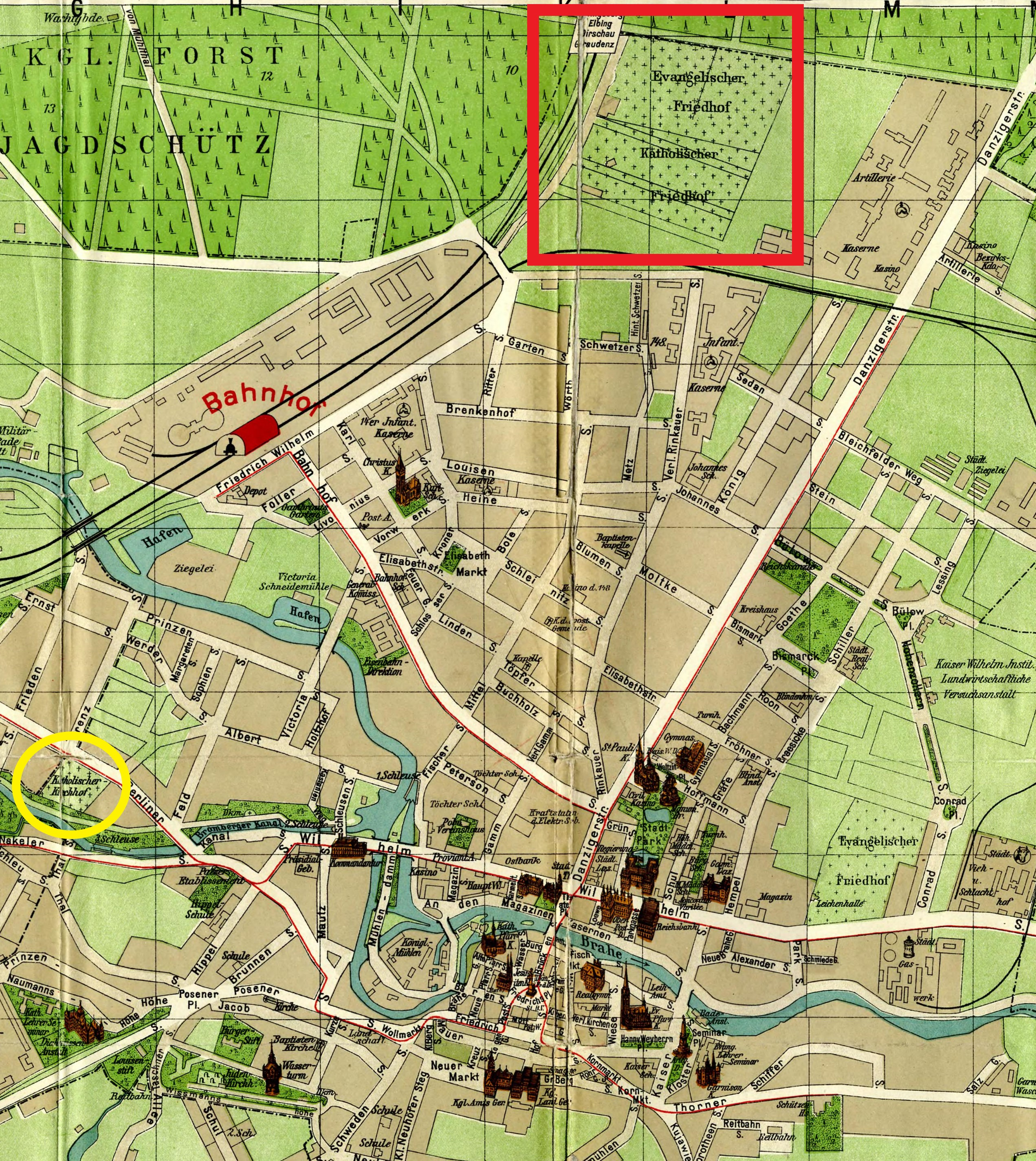
Nowofarny (red) and Starofarny (yellow) cemeteries on a 1908 map

=== Prussian period ===
The cemetery was founded in 1905, as the second cemetery of the Catholic parish in Bydgoszcz (then called Bromberg). It intended to be a substitute for the initial downtown cemetery, then called "Starofarny" (English: Pld parish) which had reached its full capacity.

The initiators of the project were Ryszard Markwart, the Bromberg parish priest, and Władysław Gogoliński, an architect who founded with Emil Warmiński the Polish House (Polish: Dom Polski), an institution promoting Polishness during Prussian occupation. The cemetery was designed by Ernst Larass (1866–1942), who belonged to a famous family of Bydgoszcz green designers.

In the central point of the cemetery, a chapel was built according to the design by Roger Sławski. The cemetery was rectangular, with a funeral chapel in its center: the 26 sections were delineated by the crossing of circular and perpendicular alleys.

Until the establishment of later Catholic parish cemeteries in the 1920s, the Nowofarny cemetery served as the main urban necropolis for Catholics.

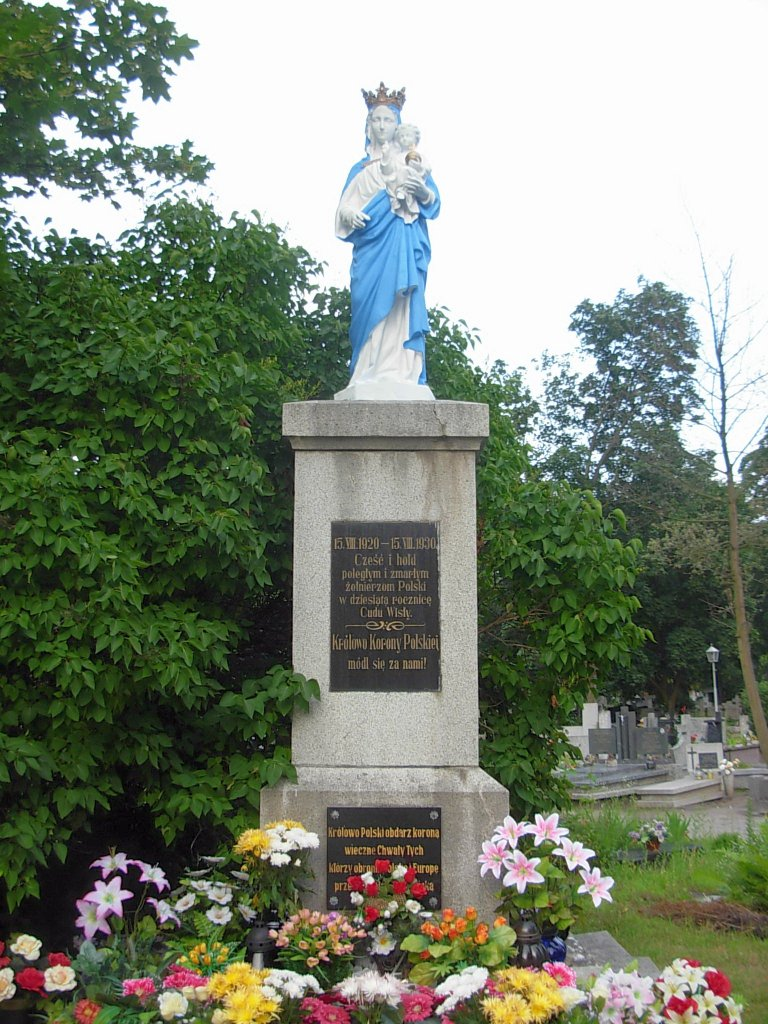
"Blessed Virgin Mary Queen of Poland"

In its center are located the graves of WWI soldiers, Greater Poland uprising insurgents (1918–1919) and Polish–Soviet War soldiers (1920).

During the Greater Poland uprising (1918–1919), the house of the cemetery inspector Andrzej Sikorski was a meeting place for the Bydgoszcz Polish community and a collection point for weapons for the insurgents.

=== Interwar period ===
In 1930, for the 25th anniversary of the creation of the Insurgents section of the cemetery, the sculptor Jakub Job realized a monument to the Blessed Virgin Mary Queen of Poland, depicting St Mary with Child. The sculpture was restored in 2018.

Furthermore, a commemorative plaque was unveiled at the same time as the statue to

Cześć i hołd poległym i zmarłym żołnierzom Polski w dziesiątą rocznicę Cudu Wisły.

Królowo Korony Polskiej, módl się za nami!

"Honor and homage [to] the fallen and deceased Polish soldiers on the tenth anniversary of the Miracle of the Vistula. Below are the words of prayer: Queen of the Polish Crown, pray for us!"

=== WWII years ===
During the German occupation, the cemetery served as a gathering beacon of Polish patriotism. Valuable works of art and books were stored in old tombs, which were returned to museum collections and private hands after the conflict.

The hostages murdered at the Old Market Square were buried in the cemetery. In their graves were placed objects or "distinguishing marks" in special boxes, thanks to which, after the war, the exhumed bodies could be identified.

During the war, the administrator's house of the Nowofarny cemetery became, like in 1919-1920, a place of conspiracy of the Home Army and a shelter for the underground. In particular, the place hid Major Józef Gruss (aka "Stanisław"), the head of intelligence of the Pomeranian District of the Home Army, till his arrest in May 1944.

In 1945, a municipal cemetery was established in an adjacent plot, east to Nowofarny: it comprised a military cemetery and an honorific area. In the military premises were buried nearly 1,200 Soviet soldiers who died during the liberation of Bydgoszcz (January 1945) and more than 200 prisoners of war. In later years, an obelisk was unveiled in honor of the fallen soldiers together with a commemorative plaque.

In the other part of the municipal graveyard, an "Alley of the Distinguished" was established. It houses the burials of deceased party activists and officials of the state administration of Polish People's Republic in Bydgoszcz.

=== Polish People's Republic (1945–1989) ===
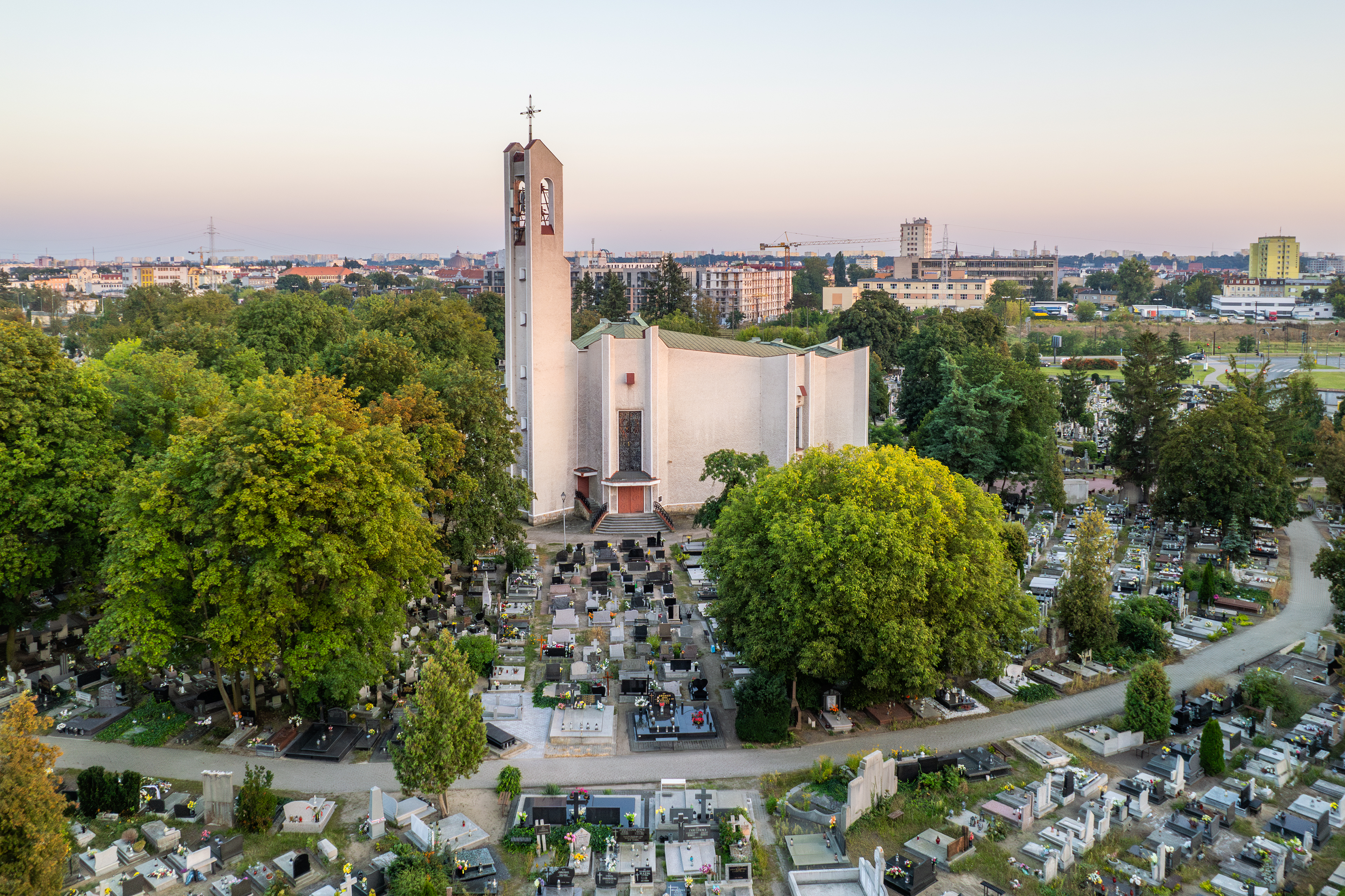
View of the Church of the Holy Cross

After the Second World War, the land parcel to the north, belonging to the Evangelical-Augsburg Parish of Bydgoszcz, became the main urban Evangelical cemetery, due to the transformation of the large, historic cemetery on Jagiellońska Street Street into an urban park.

In 1971, a new Catholic pastoral center was established, with the Nowofarny cemetery chapel as its seat. On December 1, 1979, the Parish of the Holy Cross in Bydgoszcz was created: following dragging troubles to consent on the location of the new church, it was decided to rebuild the cemetery chapel between 1982 and 1986. The project led by Father Prelate Eugeniusz Barełkowski was carried out following the design of Bydgoszcz engineers Jerzy Tomaszewski (main building) and Zbigniew Lewiński (towers).

The new church was consecrated on 16 December 1990, by Father Cardinal Józef Glemp then Primate of Poland. It has an area of 970 m^{2} and hosts catechetical rooms and a rectory in a side edifice.

=== Recent period ===
After 1989, an area was designated for the burial of civilians in the municipal cemetery. Six years later, it was integrated into the Nowofarny cemetery and transferred to the responsibility of the Bydgoszcz Cathedral Parish. The military section of Red Army soldiers, separated by a strip of greenery, is still maintained by municipal services.

A renovation of the ancient tombstones of the distinguished Bydgoszcz notables started in the 1990s. The works are supported by funds collected by the Bydgoszcz community during All Souls' Day. In 2018, this money additionally financed, among others, the renovation of one of a brick cemetery gate with wrought iron doors and 2 wicket gates, which were listed on the Heritage Register of monuments.

The Evangelical-Augsburg Cemetery to the north has been entered into the Kuyavian-Pomeranian Voivodeship Heritage List of monuments in 1994, under the number A/820/1-3.

== Characteristics ==
This catholic cemetery is rectangular (330 metres (1,080 ft)×245 metres (804 ft)) and covers an area of 7.94 hectares (19.6 acres); with the municipal cemetery the ensemble extends over 11.9 hectares (29 acres). The graveyard itself is partitioned into 28 divisions. The central point of the site is occupied by the Church of the Holy Cross, from which radiates alleys.

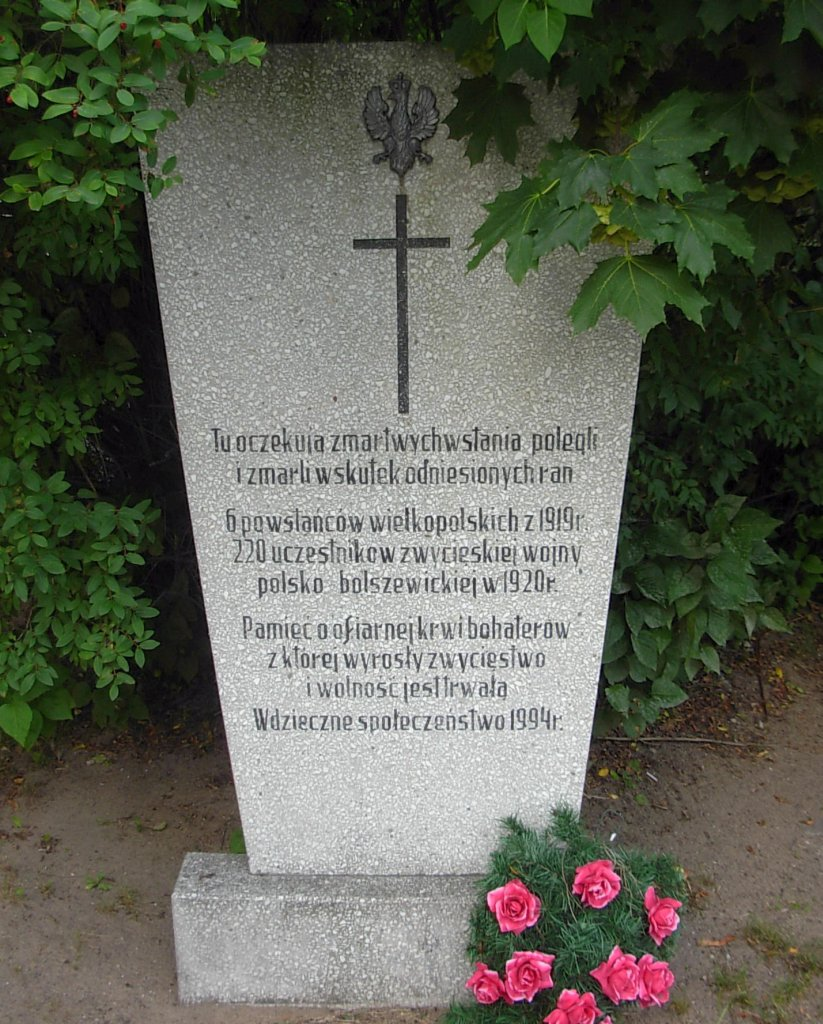
Explanatory board in the Polish–Soviet War section

The necropolis contains:

- 76 standing tombstones, 88 graves and 6 tombstone chapels from the first half of the 20th century;
- 2,480 standing tombstones from the second half of the 20th century.

The oldest tomb dates back to 1906.

=== World War I Soldiers' Quarters ===
The section is located along Artyleryjska Street. It is lawn-laid and houses a commemorative plaque with the following: Grave of soldiers who died during World War I 1914-1918.

=== 1919–1920 wars section ===
This plot is located south of the Church of the Holy Cross. It comprises:

- 6 insurgents from the Greater Poland uprising (1918–1919). Close to the latter stands a monument to the Blessed Virgin Mary Queen of Poland;
- 220 soldiers of the Polish–Soviet War (1920), with an explanatory board.

=== Polish Army Soldiers' section (1945) ===
The division is located next to the grave of WWI soldiers, along Artyleryjska Street. There are 35 common graves, containing 129 soldiers who died during WWII battles in Bydgoszcz.

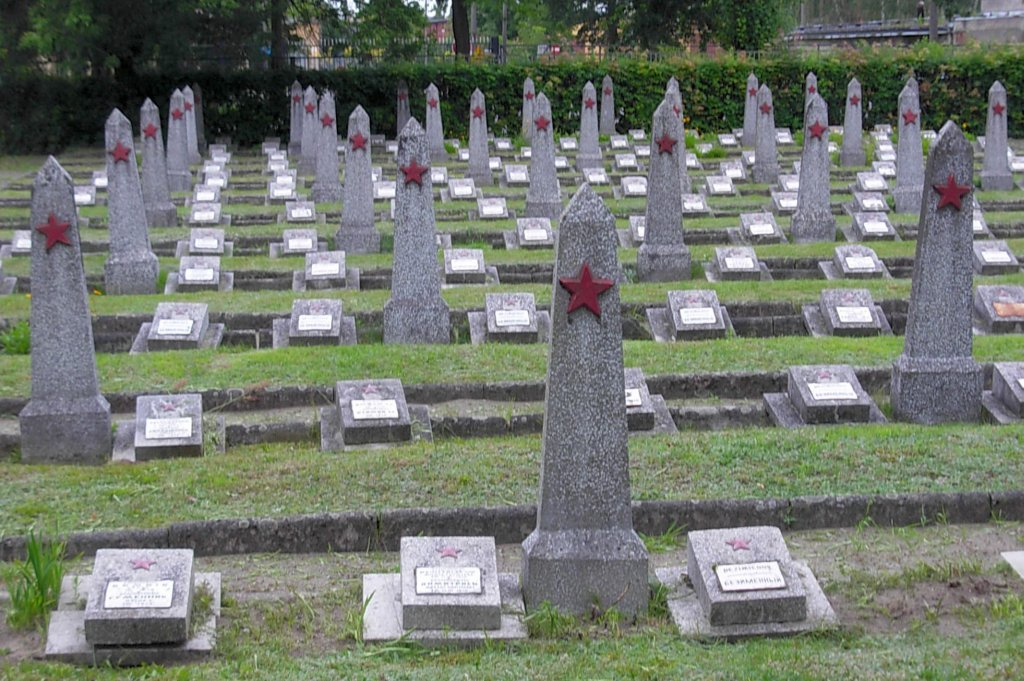
View of the Soviet soldiers' graveyard

=== Soviet Army Soldiers' Quarters ===
The section lies in the eastern part of the cemetery, originally on the civilian municipal area, from which it is separated by a strip of greenery. In the centre of the plot stands an obelisk in honor of the fallen ones, along with a commemorative plaque with inscriptions in Polish and Russian, mentioning

Eternal Glory to the Heroes of the Red Army, who died in the fight for the liberation of our city. The inhabitants of Bydgoszcz.

The division was established on 13 March 1946 and it has been receiving sepultures from various locations in the vicinity until 1947.

The site houses 1,545 graves of Soviet soldiers who died during the liberation of Bydgoszcz and the fighting in the vicinity. The tombstones are marked with obelisks carrying a red star; some of them (552) have plaques with the name and the origin of the exhumed soldier's.

=== Municipal area ===
In January 1969, the municipal division was opened to bury distinguished political activists and members of the Polish United Workers' Party (Polish: Polska Zjednoczona Partia Robotnicza - PZPR).

Since 1970, several dozen people have been interred here:

- members of the PZPR (e.g. Józef Rakoczy, Józef Majchrzak);
- employees of the Voivodeship and City National Council (e.g. Kazimierz Maludziński, Józef Powalisz);
- military commanders;
- officers of the Citizens' Militia (e.g. general Józef Kozdra, provincial commander of the Citizens' Militia);
- Security Service members;
- ordinary citizens who did not want a religious burial.

Currently, this section has a separate entrance from Artyleryjska Street.

== Famous burials ==
The Nowofarny Cemetery is the largest burial place of distinguished Bydgoszcz residents. It hosts the graves of social activists, patriotic fighters, Honorary Citizens of the City of Bydgoszcz, Presidents of Bydgoszcz, doctors, teachers, writers, and artists.

Among all these famous people buried in the Nowofarny Cemetery, one can cite the following:

Name	Birth year	Death year	Remarks
Władysław Baranowski	1900	1972	Doctor of Medicine. After graduating from the University of Warsaw (1928), he worked at the Sanatorium in Smukała (1929–1932), then became head of the St. Florian Hospital. During World War II, he worked in Lublin. In 1945, he reorganized the Municipal Pulmonary Hospital at Seminaryjna Street and stayed at its head until 1967. Awarded the Knight's Cross of the Order of Polonia Restituta. His name was given to a street in the Bydgoszcz district of Smukała Dolna.
Jerzy Bartnicki	1910	1988	Journalist, writer. He worked from 1928 in the local newspapers "Dziennik Bydgoski", "Nowy Kurier" (Poznań) and in the Printing Plant Institute (Polish: Zakłady Graficzne) (Bydgoszcz). During the occupation he worked in a German knitwear company. From 1945 onwards, Jerzy was employed in various trading companies. Author of numerous feuilletons, theatre reviews, historical texts printed in the Bydgoszcz press, and historical studies about Bydgoszcz and monographs.
Witold Bełza	1886	1955	Librarian, writer, publicist and cultural activist. He was the director of the Provincial and Municipal Public Library of Bydgoszcz from 1920 to 1939 and from 1945 to 1952.
Jan Biziel	1858	1934	German and Polish physician, social activist, city councilor of Bydgoszcz. He was designated "Honorary Citizen of Bydgoszcz" in 1930.
Kazimierz Borucki	1898	1986	Insurgent in the Greater Poland uprising (1918–1919), curator and director of the Municipal Museum (1921–1939 and 1946-1965). In September 1939, he secured paintings from state, church and private collections. Fighter in the Home Army. Awarded the papal order Pro Ecclesia et Pontifice and the Polish Cross of Independence, the Knight's Cross of the Order of Polonia Restituta and the Cross of Merit. His name was given to a street in the Bydgoszcz district of Fordon.
Józef Bronikowski	1851	1926	Hydrotechnical engineer, social and independence activist. From 1920, he was an inspector of Waterways and supervised the construction of a new section of the Bydgoszcz Canal and its locks. Awarded the Officer's Cross of the Order of Polonia Restituta. His name was given to a street in the Bydgoszcz district of Wilczak.
Stanisław Brzęczkowski	1897	1955	Graphic artist and typographist. Teacher at the Bydgoszcz School of Fine Arts. Organizer of the printing industry in the city. His name was given to a street in the Bydgoszcz district of Fordon. A commemorative plaque has been placed on the building where he lived at 17 Gdańska Street. Awarded the Cross of Merit.
Roman Chłodziński	1909	1979	Journalist and sports reporter. Prisoner of concentration camps. Since 1958, he was the editor-in-chief of the Polish Radio station. Awarded the Knight's Cross of the Order of Polonia Restituta. His name was given to a street in the Bydgoszcz district of Fordon.
Antoni Chołoniewski	1872	1924	Journalist, publicist and a national activist.
Wincenty Domisz	1929	2006	Local government activist, president of Inowrocław (1963–1973) and Bydgoszcz (1976–1982).
Waleria Drygała	1908	1969	Journalist. She worked at the Polish Radio Station from 1945 and hunted down German war criminals. She was active in charities providing assistance and care to orphans and the disadvantaged. Her name was given to a street in the Bydgoszcz district of Fordon.
Władysław Dunarowski	1902	1987	Teacher, writer, journalist and publicist. Author of novels about life in Podhale and many short stories. He cooperated with the Polish Radio Broadcasting service. Awarded the Commander's Cross of the Order of Polonia Restituta and the Golden Cross of Merit. His name was given to a square in the Bydgoszcz district of Błonie.
Ludwik Dybizbański	1882	1927	Theatre actor. Director of the Municipal Theatre of Bydgoszcz (1920, 1927) and artistic director of the Polish Theatre in Poznań (1921-1922).
Paweł Dzionara	1879	1963	Builder of railway lines and bridges in Poland and Germany. He was a member of the Polish People's Council for the city of Bydgoszcz (1924-1928).
Adam Grzymała-Siedlecki	1876	1967	Literary and theater critic, playwright, translator, prose writer and director.
Walerian Hypszer	1883	1978	Teacher. In 1914, he started working in elementary schools in Okole, Wilczak (then suburbs of Bydgoszcz) and from April 1920 he was the head of the Catholic school in Czyżkówko, managing its expansion. After WWII, he organized the Bydgoszcz education system. His name was given to the bridge over the Brda river between Czyżkówek and Jachcice.
Hieronim Konieczka	1920	1994	Actor. He had been working at the Bydgoszcz Polish Theatre for 35 years. Awarded the Knight's Cross of the Order of Polonia Restituta and the golden Cross of Merit. Patron of the Polish Theatre in Bydgoszcz.
Felicja Krysiewicz	1897	1970	Opera singer. From 1931, she was a teacher at the Municipal Conservatory of Music and founded the Bydgoszcz Music Society. Her name was given to a street in the Bydgoszcz district of Fordon. A bust of Felicja Krysiewicz is displayed in the lobby of the Opera Nova. Awarded the golden Cross of Merit.
Alfons Licznerski	1902	1976	Architect. In 1936, he became the head of the Municipal Urban Planning Studio. He designed the Bydgoszcz Polish Theatre. His name was given to a street in the Bydgoszcz district of Fordon.
Stanisław Łabendziński	1880	1933	Doctor of Chemistry. Head of the Municipal Mathematical and Natural Sciences Gymnasium and expert in tourism issues. He organized the Bydgoszcz branch of the Polish Tourist Society. Secretary of the Committee for the Construction of the Henryk Sienkiewicz Monument. He penned the first Polish guidebook entitled "Illustrated Guide in Bydgoszcz" (Polish: Ilustrowany przewodnik po Bydgoszczy). His name was given to a street in the Bydgoszcz district of Fordon.
Michał Łempicki	1856	1930	Mining engineer and entrepreneur. Public and political figure, deputy of the State Duma of the Russian Empire for the Piotrków Governorate.
Jan Maciaszek	1876	1932	Lawyer and insurgent during the Greater Poland uprising. He was in 1919 the commissioned mayor of Bydgoszcz, taking over power from the German mayor. His name was given to a street in the Bydgoszcz district of Miedzyń.
Zygmunt Malewski	1873	1937	Polish writer, city archivist. Author of numerous publications about the history of Bydgoszcz and the cultural life of the city. Founder of the first historical and regional magazine in Bydgoszcz, "Przegląd Bydgoski". His commemorative plaque was placed on the former building of the city archives at 65 Dworcowa Street.
Adam Marcinkowski	1942	2020	Historian, academic teacher and professor of humanities. He was the first rector of the Kazimierz Wielki University in Bydgoszcz. Awarded the Officer's Cross of the Order of Polonia Restituta and the golden Cross of Merit.
Ryszard Markwart	1868	1906	German-Polish catholic priest and Polish national activist who served in Magdeburg, Berlin and Bydgoszcz. He strove for the construction of the Holy Trinity Church. Founder of the Nowofarny Cemetery. His name was given to a street in downtown Bydgoszcz.
Józef Milchert	1874	1930	Merchant and inventor, author of 25 patents. Founder of the Byudgoszcz Merchants' Society. Awarded the Officer's Cross of the Order of Polonia Restituta.
Edmund Nartowicz	1928	2015	Internal medicine physician and professor of medical sciences, co-founder of the Medical Academy in Bydgoszcz. From 1985 to 2000, he headed the Department and Clinic of Cardiology and Internal Medicine of the Medical Academy in Bydgoszcz. Awarded the Commander's Cross of the Order of Polonia Restituta and the golden Cross of Merit.
Konrad Pałubicki	1910	1992	Composer, musicologist, teacher and cultural activist and animator of musical life in Gdańsk and Bydgoszcz. He taught at the Academy of Music in Gdańsk and the Institute of Music Education of the Higher Pedagogical School in Bydgoszcz (today's Kazimierz Wielki University in Bydgoszcz). Awarded the Knight's Cross of the Order of Polonia Restituta and the golden Cross of Merit.
Władysław Piórek	1852	1926	Physician, social and national activist. He was the first person to be made Honorary Citizen of Bydgoszcz.
Halina Marianna Rutkowska	1914	1991	aka Urszula, Polish national activist and captain of the Home Army.
Tadeusz Skarbek-Malczewski	1873	1929	Priest. Dean and prelate of Pope Pius XI, he supervised the renovation the Poor Clares church. He founded the Catholic House at 1 Grodzka Street and consecrated the Garrison Church. His name was given to a street in the old town district of Bydgoszcz.
Józef Święcicki	1859	1913	Designer and builder of Bydgoszcz, under Prussian rule. A vast majority of his eclectic-style works can still be found all around the city.
Jan Teska	1876	1945	Journalist, publisher of the "Dziennik Bydgoski", national activist and Polish politician from the 1900s till the end of World War II.
Roman Träger	1923	1987	Soldier and intelligence officer during the Nazi occupation of Poland. Awarded the Order of the Cross of Grunwald
Stefania Tuchołkowa	1874	1924	Journalist, writer and national activist.
Marian Turwid	1905	1987	Writer, painter and cultural activist in Bydgoszcz, and member of the National Committee of the National Unity Front (Polish: Front Jedności Narodu, FJN) in 1958. Awarded the golden Cross of Merit, the Order of the Banner of Labour 2nd class and the Knight's Cross of the Order of Polonia Restituta.

== Tombstones gallery ==
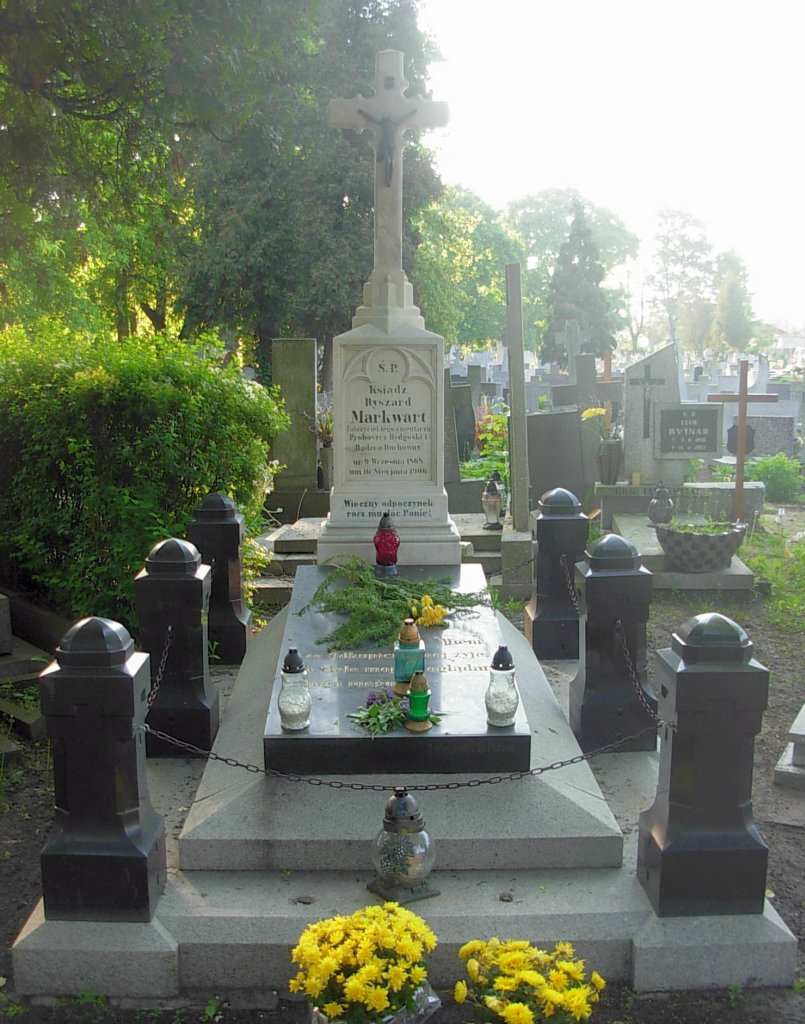
Ryszard Markwart

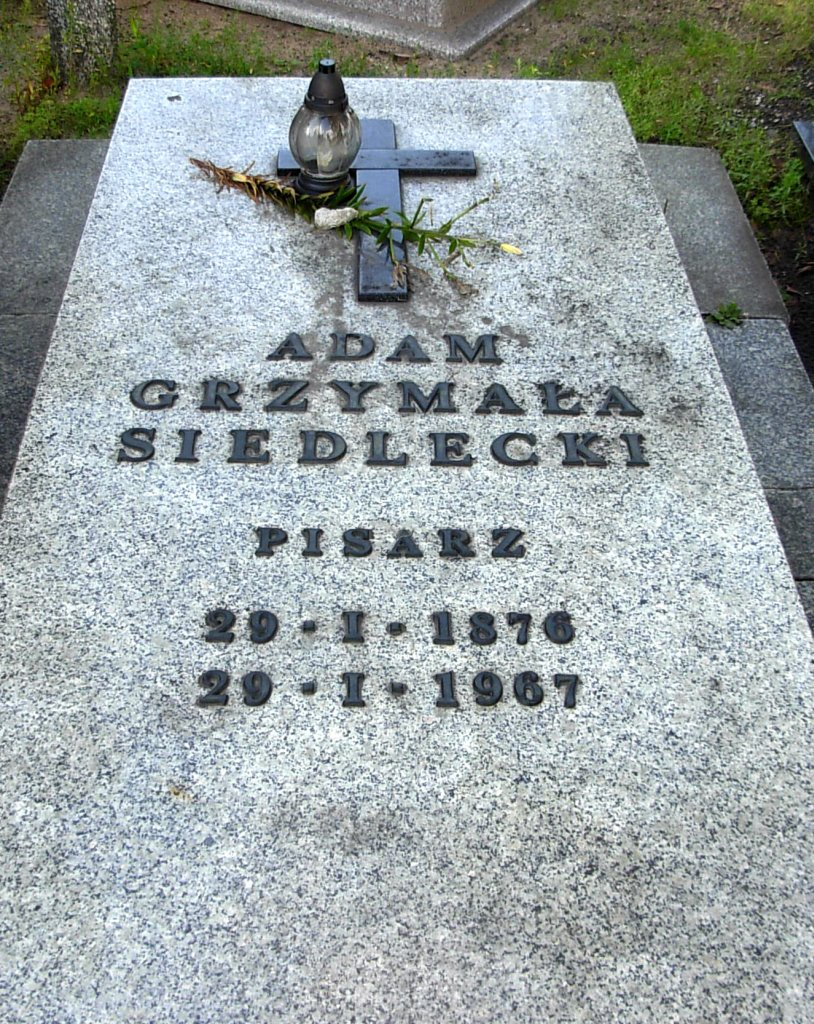
Adam Grzymała-Siedlecki

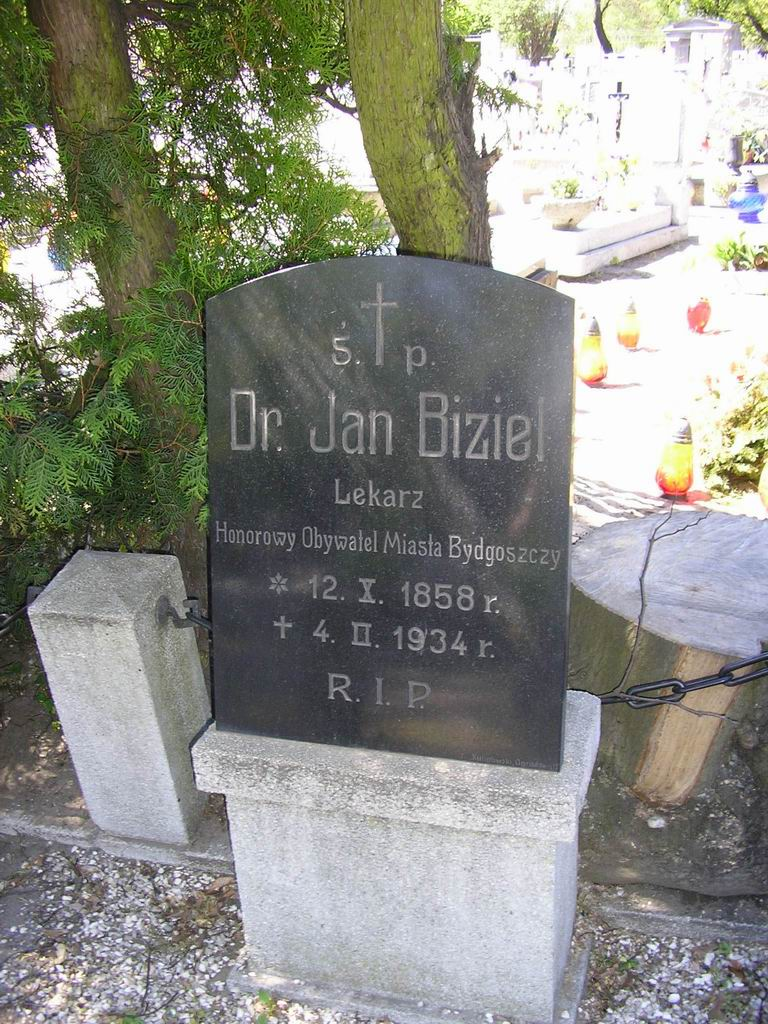
Jan Biziel

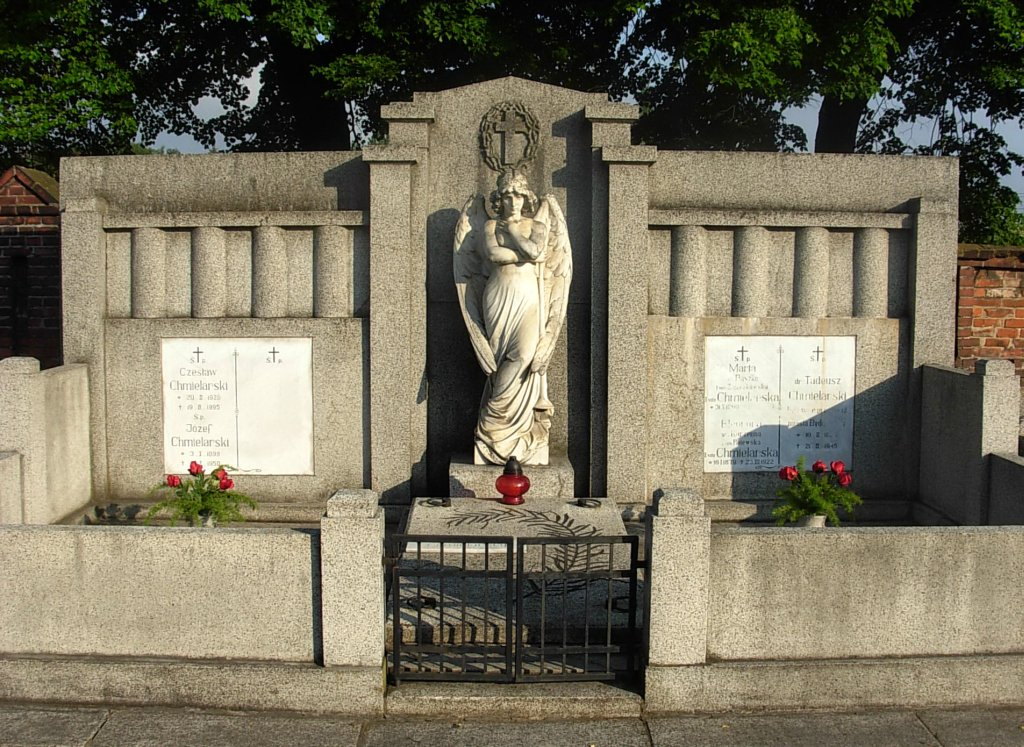
Chmielarski family

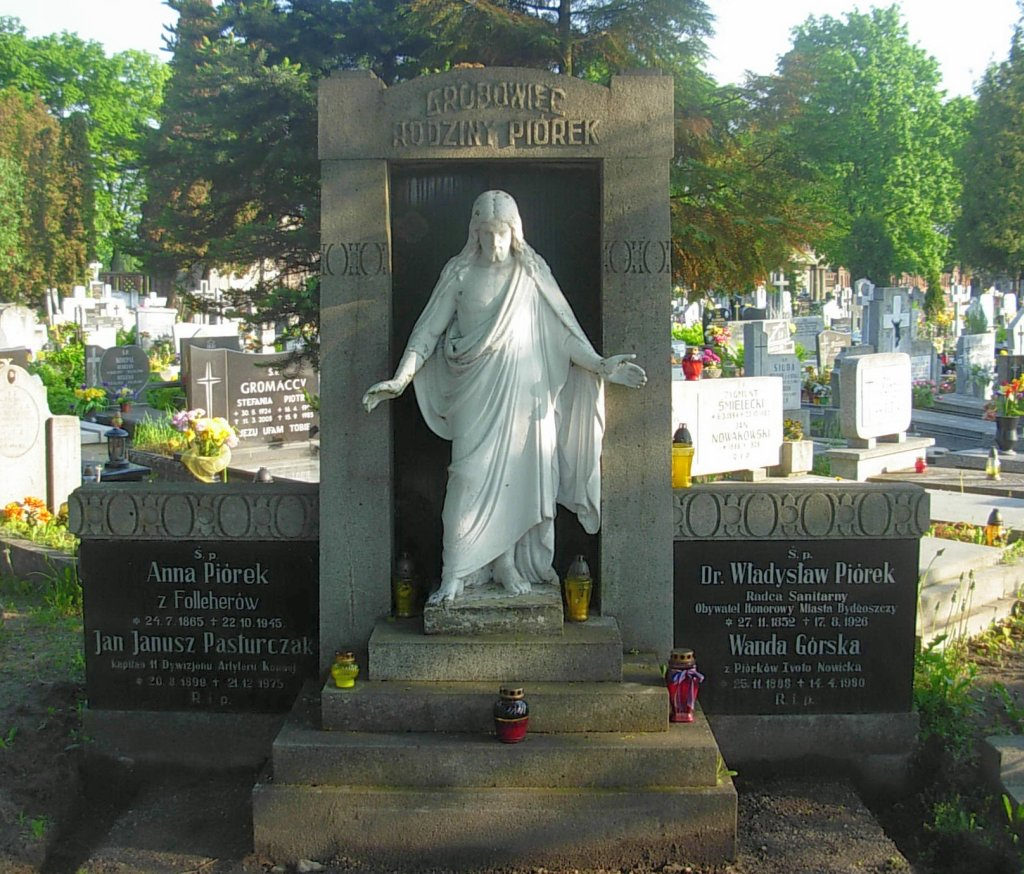
Piórek family

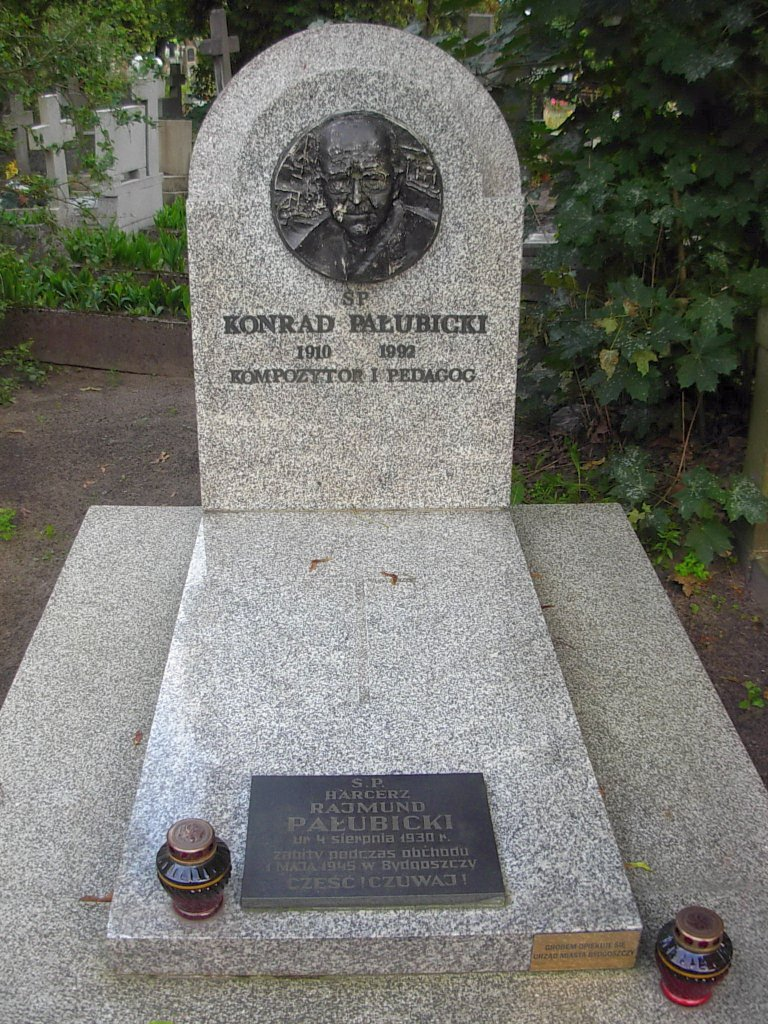
Konrad Pałubicki

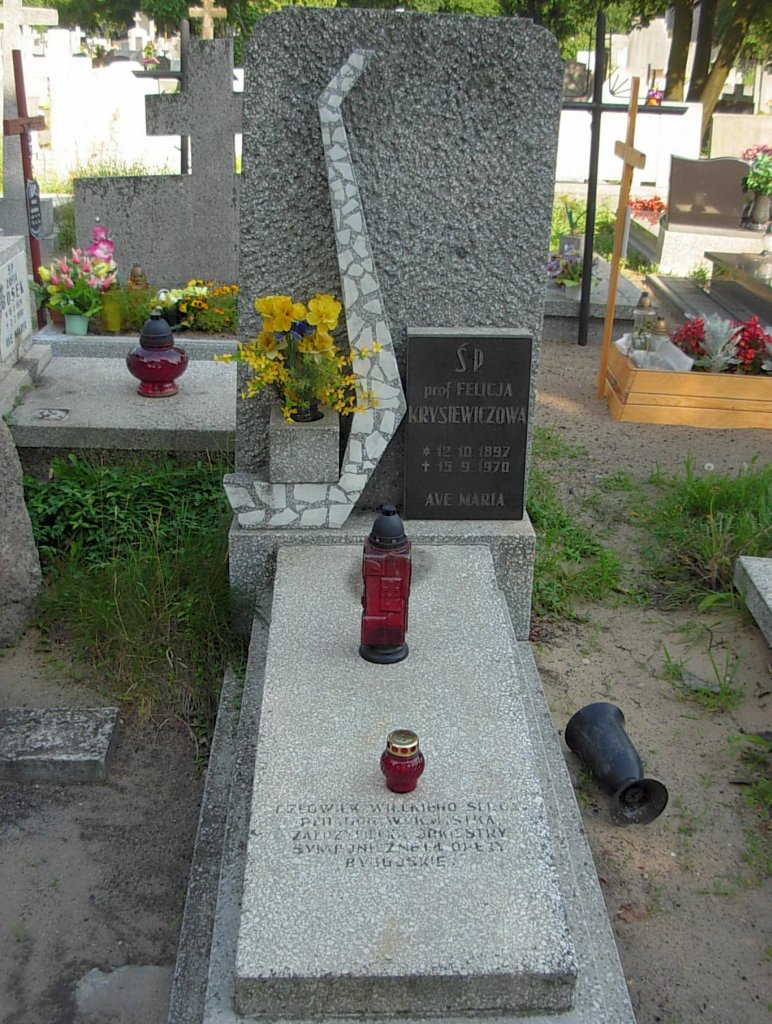
Felicja Krysiewiczowa

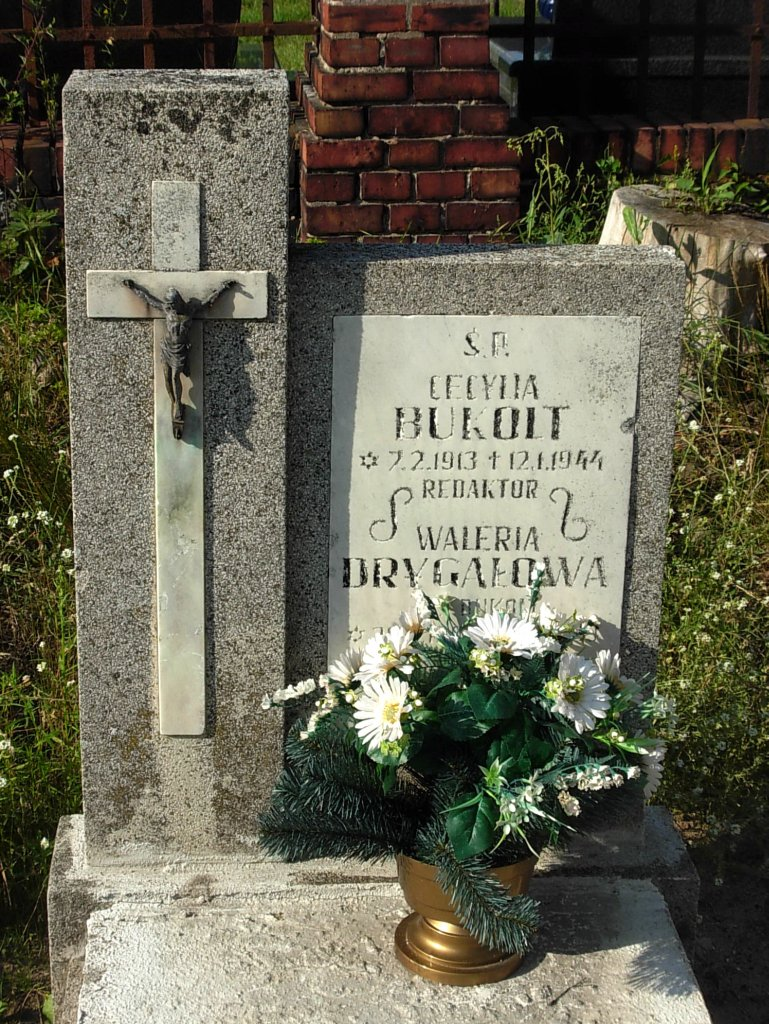
Waleria Drygałowa

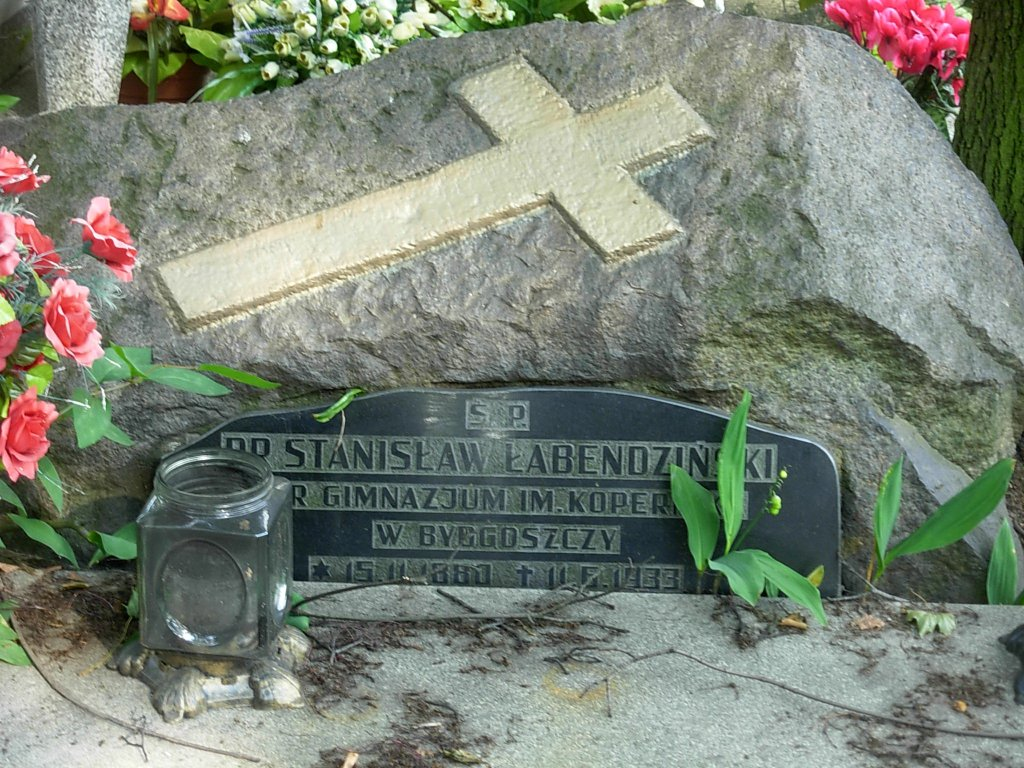
Stanisław Łabędziński

== See also ==
- Starofarny Cemetery in Bydgoszcz
- Wincenty Witos Park, Bydgoszcz

== Bibliography ==
- (in Polish) Zbigniew, Woźniak (1996). Bydgoskie cmentarze. Bydgoska Gospodarka Komunalna [Bydgoszcz cemeteries. Bydgoszcz Municipal Economy]. Bydgoszcz: Instytut Wydawniczy „Świadectwo”. pp. 87–88. ISBN 83-85860-37-1.
- (in Polish) Grzybowski, Przemysław (1993). Cmentarz Starofarny i jego rola w świetle historii pozostałych cmentarzy bydgoskich. Kronika Bydgoska XIII [The Starofarny Cemetery and its role in the light of the history of other cemeteries in Bydgoszcz. Kronika Bydgoska XIII] (in Polish). Bydgoszcz: Towarzystwo Miłośników Miasta Bydgoszczy. ISBN 83-85860-37-1.
- (in Polish) Piechocka, Ewa (1979). O czym mówią cmentarze. Kalendarz Bydgoski [What do cemeteries talk about. Bydgoszcz Calendar] (in Polish). Bydgoszcz: Towarzystwo Miłośników Miasta Bydgoszczy. pp. 146–151.
- (in Polish) Gliwiński, Eugeniusz (2000). Kwatery żołnierskie na bydgoskich cmentarzach. Kalendarz Bydgoski [Soldiers' plots in Bydgoszcz cemeteries. Bydgoszcz Calendar] (in Polish). Bydgoszcz: Towarzystwo Miłośników Miasta Bydgoszczy. pp. 289–296.
