= Treger =

Treger may refer to:

- Charles Treger, American violinist
- A version of the name Tregeare, a hamlet in Cornwall, England
- A Breton version of the name Trégor, Brittany, France (see Kernev, Leon and Treger)

== See also ==
- Träger (surname)
- Trager
- Pakn Treger
