= Józef Milchert =

Polish merchant, industrialist and social activist (1874–1930)

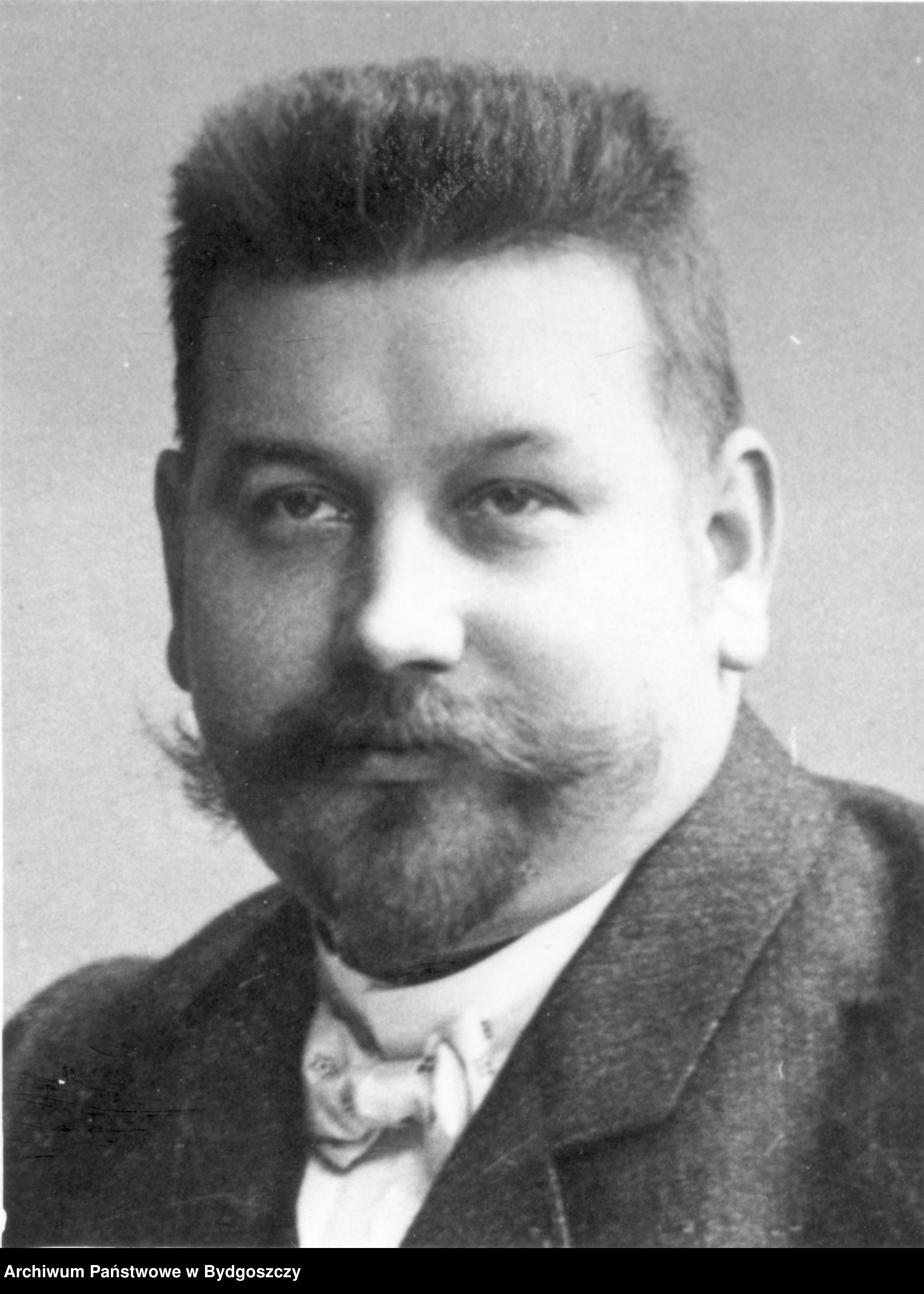
- Picture of Józef Milchert ca. 1910
- Born: 9 January 1874; Osiek, German Empire
- Died: 8 June 1930 (aged 56); Bydgoszcz, Poland
- Occupations: Merchant, industrialist, social activist
- Spouse: Teofila née Ziętak
- Children: Edward, Maria, Henryk, Anna, Józef and Witold
- Parent(s): Jan Milchert and Marianna née Behrendt
- Awards

Józef Milchert (1874–1930) was a Polish merchant, industrialist and a social activist living in Bydgoszcz.

== Biography ==
Józef was born on 9 January 1874, in the village of Osiek (German: Markwall) located 20 kilometres (12 mi) west of Koronowo, in the Bydgoszcz County. His mother was Marianna née Behrendt, his father Jan Milchert, a farmer.

He graduated from the elementary school in Osiek. At the age of 15, Józef went to the nearby village of Mrocza to be an apprentice in a shop. After learning merchant's trade, he became in 1892 a merchant's assistant in several cities: Nakło nad Notecią, Bydgoszcz and Grudziądz.

He made his military service in the Second (1st Pomeranian) Foot Artillery "von Hindersin" billeted in Swinemünde (Polish: Świnoujście), from 1894 to 1896. This year, Milchert settled permanently in Bydgoszcz, but kept working there and in Inowrocław as a merchant's assistant till 1899.

Advertising for Milchert liqueurs, 1915 address book

At the turn of the 20th century, he founded a liqueur and vodka factory, which soon was one of the biggest Polish factory in the city. He received awards for his products at the industrial exhibitions of Bydgoszcz (1910) and Toruń (1913). His selling point was established at Neuer Markt 3 (today's 5 New Market Square).

Furthermore, Józef was an inventor and author of 25 patents.

=== Social activist ===
Milchert combined his professional business with national and social activities. On 8 March 1909, he initiated the establishment of the Towarzystwo Kupców Samodzielnych z Bydgoszczy (English: Society of Independent Merchants in Bydgoszcz). This association was based on the Social and Merchant Circle at the Industrial Society (Koło Towarzysko-Kupieckiego przy Towarzystwie Przemysłowym), established in 1898 in the city.

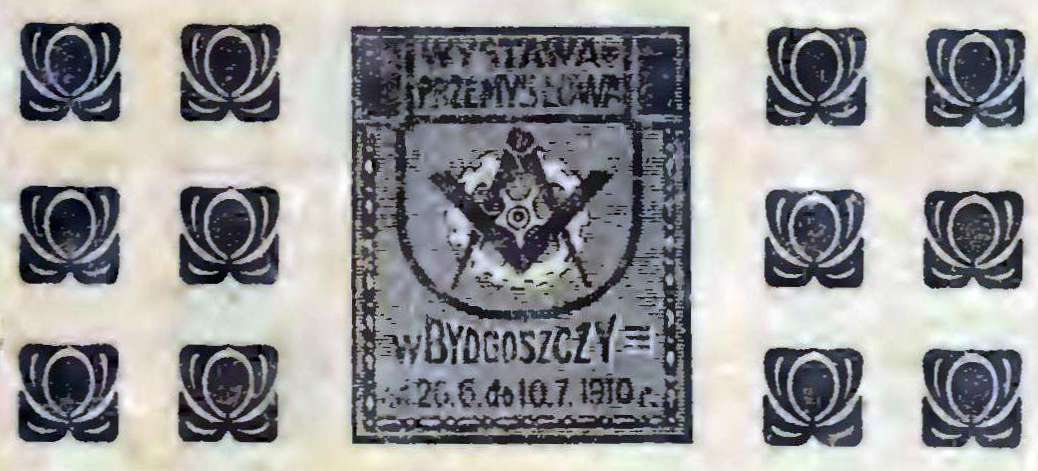
Logo of Bydgoszcz Industrial exhibition 1910

The Towarzystwo Kupców Samodzielnych z Bydgoszczy, led by Milchert, organised the first Polish Industrial Exhibition in Bydgoszcz (Polish: Polska wystawa przemysłowa w Bydgoszczy) from 26 June to 10 July 1910, which gathered more than 120 exhibitors.

Meetings of Polish national and social activists were held in his apartment. Józef championed the project to erect a church for Polish Catholics in Bydgoszcz. Investing time and money, the Church of the Holy Trinity was eventually consecrated in 1913. Milchert was called the King of Poland by the German citizen of Bydgoszcz.

After WWI, he served as the treasurer of the newly created Supreme People's Council for the city of Bydgoszcz (Polish: Naczelna Rada Ludowa na miasto Bydgoszcz). The council, set up on 16 November 1918, had Jan Biziel for its president and Jan Teska for its secretary; this body dealt with many aspects of the life of the city and the vicinity (e.g. finances, immigrants, health).

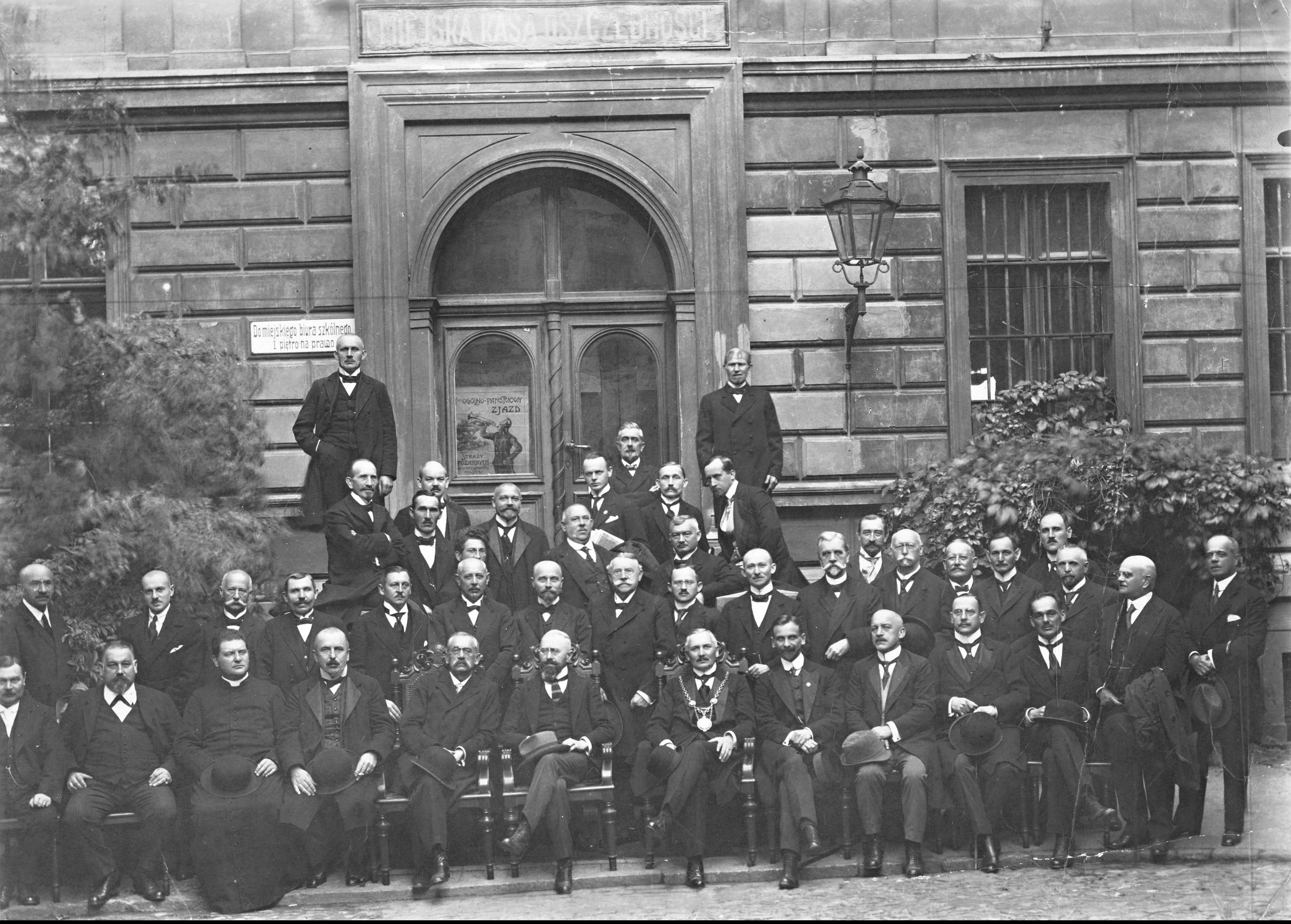
Bydgoszcz City Council 1920–21, Józef Milchert is the second from the left, first row

On 19 January 1920, Józef Milchert participated in the historic ceremony of the return of Bydgoszcz into the re-created Polish state.

In August, he was appointed a councilor at the City Council and on 30 June 1921, he became one of its member. He was in charge of the savings bank, the City Slaughterhouse on Jagiellońska Street and the Municipal Market Hall on Podwale Street.

In 1921, he was elected to the position of the 3rd honorary city councilor, then re-elected in 1925.

Milchert participated comprehensively in the organization of the economic life in Bydgoszcz. He had many positions in institutions and organizations, among which:

- member of the supervisory board of the Fabryka Wyrobów Metalowych Fema (Fema Metal Products Factory), located at 11 Doktora Emila Warmińskiego street;
- president and honorary member of the Industrial and Craft Society (Towarzystwo Przemysłowo-Rzemieślnicze);
- member of the supervisory board of the Greater Poland Carbide Factory;
- chairman of the supervisory board of the Drukarnia Bydgoska;
- chairman of the supervisory board of the Ludowy Bank '(Polish: People's Bank);
- member of the Society of Merchant Students.

He penned memoirs about the Greater Poland Uprising.

Józef Milchert died on 8 June 1930, in Bydgoszcz. He was buried at the Nowofarny Cemetery. His obituary mentioned that he was considered as part of the

[...]old guard of patriots – Poles in Bydgoszcz, who led the Polish citizenship and people towards the rebirth of Poland, regardless of anything and anyone.

== Personal life ==
Józef Milchert was married to Teofila née Ziętak. The couple had five children:

- Edward (stepson, born 1892);
- Maria (born 1901);
- Henryk (born 1903);
- Anna (born 1905);
- Józef (born 1907);
- Witold (born 1930).

Teofila was very active in associative circles, participating to the Reading Room for Women (Polish: Czytelni dla Kobiet) together with Wincentyna Teskowa or Leokadia Weynerowska. She died in 1936.

== Awards and recognition ==
Józef Milchert was awarded the Officer's Cross of the Order of Polonia Restituta on 30 April 1927, for outstanding merits in the national and social fields.

By resolution of the Bydgoszcz City Council no. XX/371/11 of 29 December 2011, a street in the Bydgoszcz Industrial and Technological Park (Polish: Bydgoski Park Przemysłowo-Technologiczny Sp. z o.o.) had been named after Józef Milchert.

== See also ==
- Bydgoszcz
- Jan Teska
- Jan Biziel
- Church of the Holy Trinity, Bydgoszcz
- Nowofarny Cemetery in Bydgoszcz

== Bibliography ==
- Błażejewski Stanisław, Kutta Janusz, Romaniuk Marek (1994). Bydgoski Słownik Biograficzny. Tom I (in Polish). Bydgoszcz: Kujawsko-Pomorskie Towarzystwo Kulturalne. pp. 80–81. ISBN 8385327266.
