= Halina Marianna Rutkowska =

Polish national activist (1914–1991)

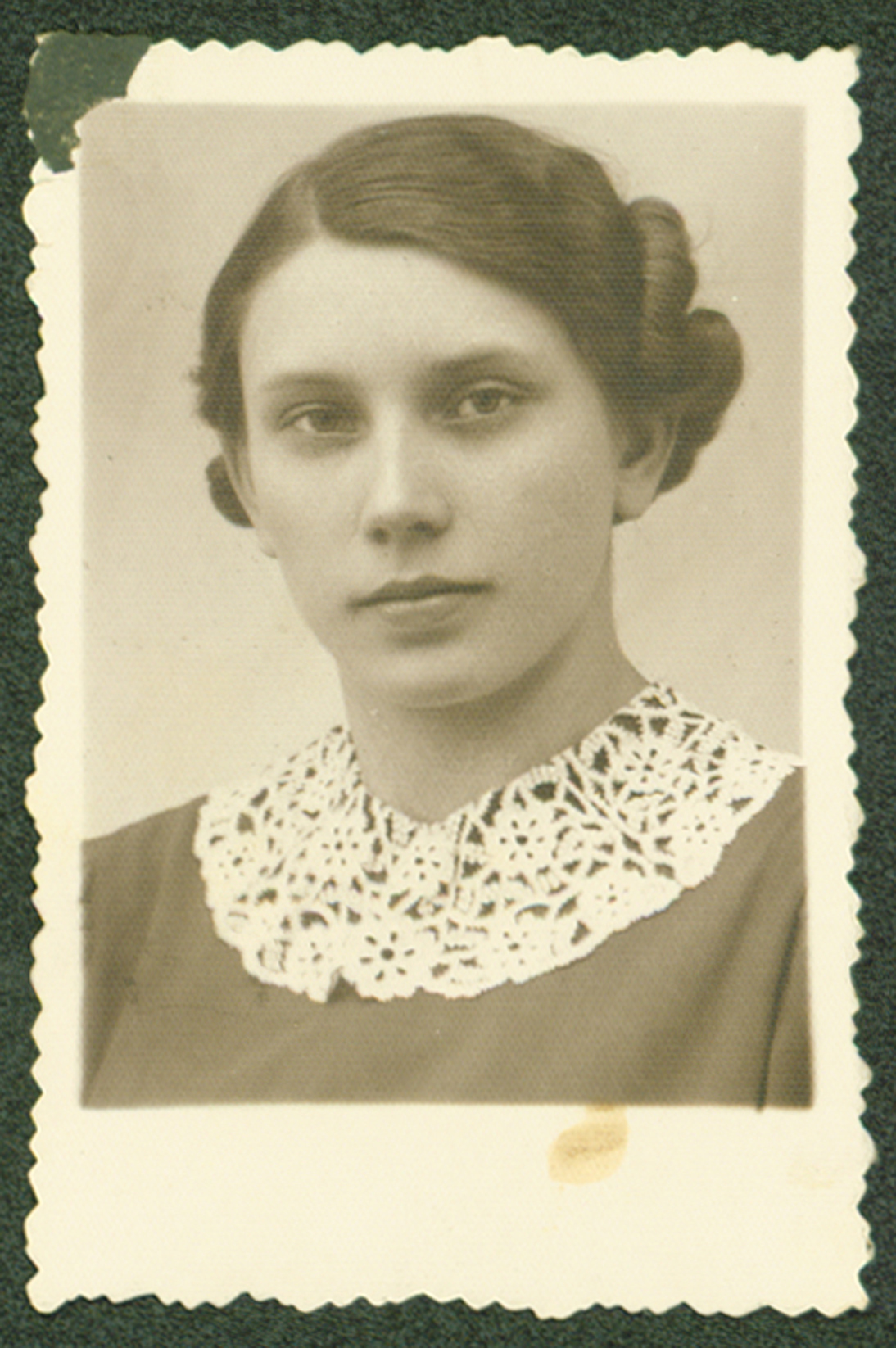
- Halina Marianna Rutkowska ca 1939
- Born: 23 November 1914; Serock, Congress Poland
- Died: 7 July 1991 (aged 76); Bydgoszcz, Poland
- Resting place: Nowofarny Cemetery in Bydgoszcz
- Other names: Urszula
- Awards: Virtuti Militari, Silver Cross Cross of Valour Cross of the Home Army Warsaw Uprising Cross

Halina Marianna Rutkowska, née Weyna, aka Urszula (1914-1991) was a Polish national activist and captain of the Home Army.

== Life ==
=== Youth ===
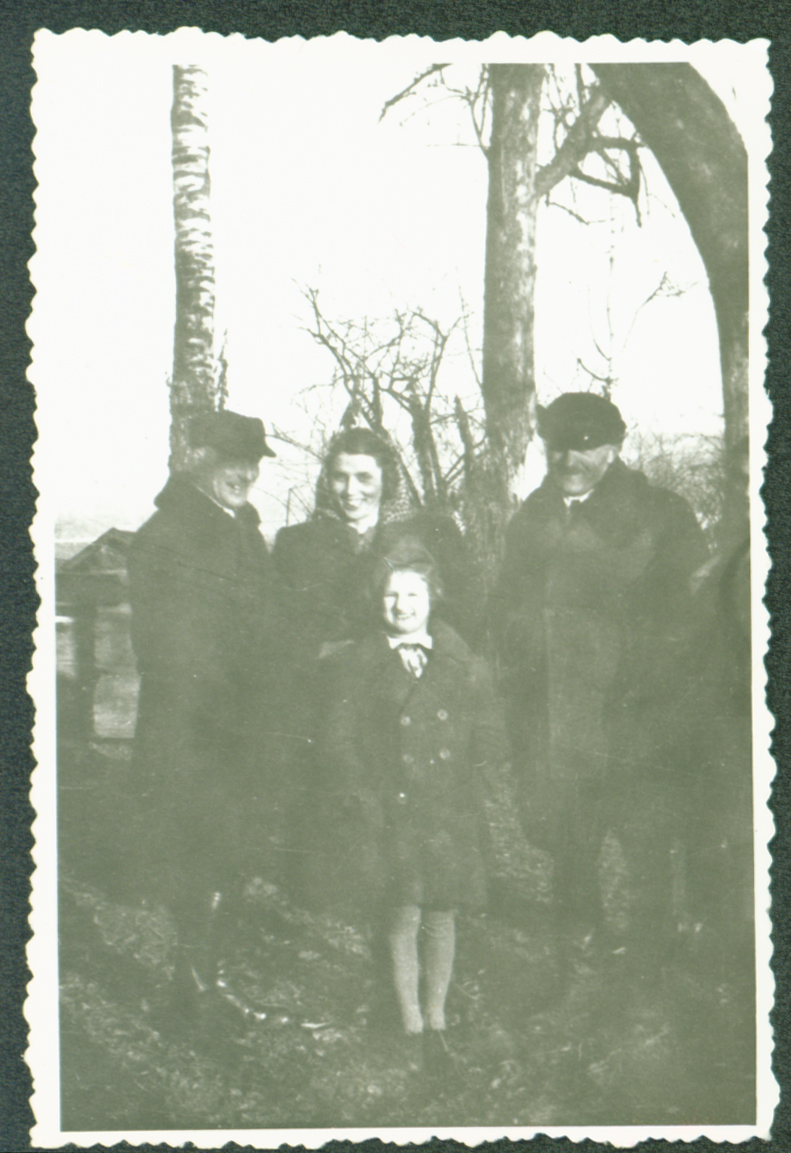
Halina Rutkowska with her family

Halina Weyna was born on 23 November 1914 in Serock, 40 kilometres (25 mi), north of Warsaw. The family had a long agricultural tradition: her father was Hieronim Weyna and her mother Joanna née Kruczyńska. At the age of 6, she began her primary school education in Świecie, then graduated with distinction from the State Faculty School in Bydgoszcz and completed vocational courses to prepare her for working in trade business.

While still in high school, she joined the Women's Military Training (PWK). In 1936, she married Dezydery Rutkowski, a painter, with whom she moved to Bydgoszcz shortly after the union. In their new home located on Gamma Street, she took up running the household.

=== Beginning of WWII ===
Dezydery was mobilized on the eve of WWII and left for the front. At this moment, Halina moved in train to her family in Kowel (now in Ukraine), but returned two weeks later to Bydgoszcz. In the early days of the occupation, Halina was thrown out of her apartment by the Germans without any warning. In this dire situation, she went to her sister living in Pomerania: here, she joined a clandestine movement to help families affected by the effects of the war. Thanks to her good knowledge of the German language, she could establish contact with the head of the German employment office (Arbeitsamt), which delivered her blank medical certificates. These papers, once filled in, allowed Polish people to avoid local or deported forced labor.

=== Underground work in Warsaw ===
Upon receiving news from her husband, imprisoned in Stalag VII-A in Bavaria, Rutkowska, together with her sister Wanda Gawlak, organized a movement to send packages to the camps. After a while, Dezydery was released, due to his deteriorating health: the reunited couple then decided to transfer to Warsaw, as the underground work in Pomerania had become increasingly difficult to run. In the Polish capital, Halina was introduced to the clandestine network by Krystyna Rutkowska, aka Magda Biała, her sister-in-law from Kłodawa. She chose the pseudonym Urszula.

As part of the Women's Military branch of the Home Army, she underwent military training and was involved in distributing underground press in Żoliborz. She later became an instructor of the organization Pomoc Żołnierzowi (PŻ) (Help for Soldiers). In 1942, she was transferred to the Department Vk (clandestine communications) of the Home Army Headquarters, where her superior was Janina Maria Sippko (1894-1974), Nom de guerre Berta. Halina's tasks included, among others, distributing headquarters clandestine mail to subordinate posts in the country and abroad.

At the outbreak of the Warsaw Uprising, Rutkowska applied the orders and moved her mail distribution point to Wilcza Street, which provided more protection. She worked as a communications officer for the Home Army Headquarters until the end of the Uprising. Together with the rest of the staff, she escaped through the sewers from the Old Town to the downtown district, reaching the basement of the Post Office on Świętokrzyska Street. Following the appeal of General Antoni Chruściel (Nom de guerre Monter) to the civilian population, Urszula created groups of volunteers who carried food supplies for the insurgents, under German fire. She never gave up this activity, even after sustained wounds.

After the capitulation, she fled Warsaw by train to the southern city of Proszowice, under the guise of an old woman with her child. As a PŻ instructor, she resumed her task in the vicinity of Proszowice, assisting soldiers of the Independent Guerrilla Battalion operating under the lead of major Jan Pańczakiewicz (1907-1968), aka Skała.

For her war merits, she was promoted to the rank of captain.

=== Personal life and post war years ===
Her father Hieronim died in 1939. Halina had 9 siblings: Zofia (1901-1995), Leokadia (1902-1996), Antonina who died as child (1903-1913), Wanda (1905-1991), Zygmunt (1906-1942), Edmund (1908-1940), Leonard, Regina and Kazimiera.

Rutkowska came back to Bydgoszcz in March 1945. Her daughter Genofewa was born in 1949. She was active in many associations in Bydgoszcz (Union of Fighters for Freedom and Democracy, Reserve Officers' Club) and in Warsaw (Union of Warsaw Insurgents). As a veteran of Polish fights during WWII, Halina regularly participated in official meetings and commemoration ceremonies.

She died on 7 July 1991. Urszula was buried at the Nowofarny Cemetery in Bydgoszcz.

== Awards ==
Halina Urszula received, among many awards, the main following decorations:

- Silver Cross of the Virtuti Militari;
- Cross of Valour;
- Cross of the Home Army;
- Warsaw Uprising Cross.

== Gallery ==
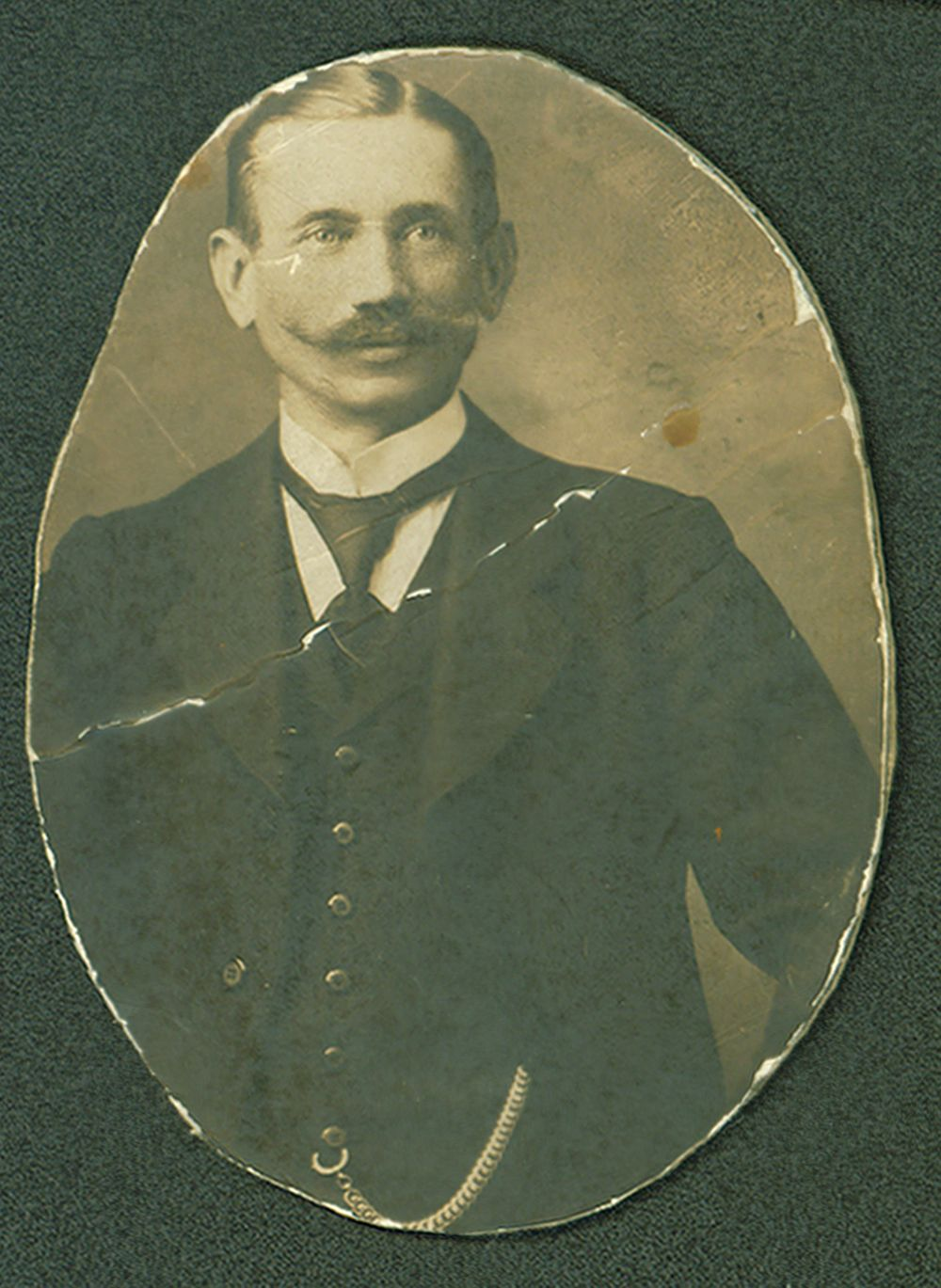
Halina Rutkowska's father, Hieronim Weyna

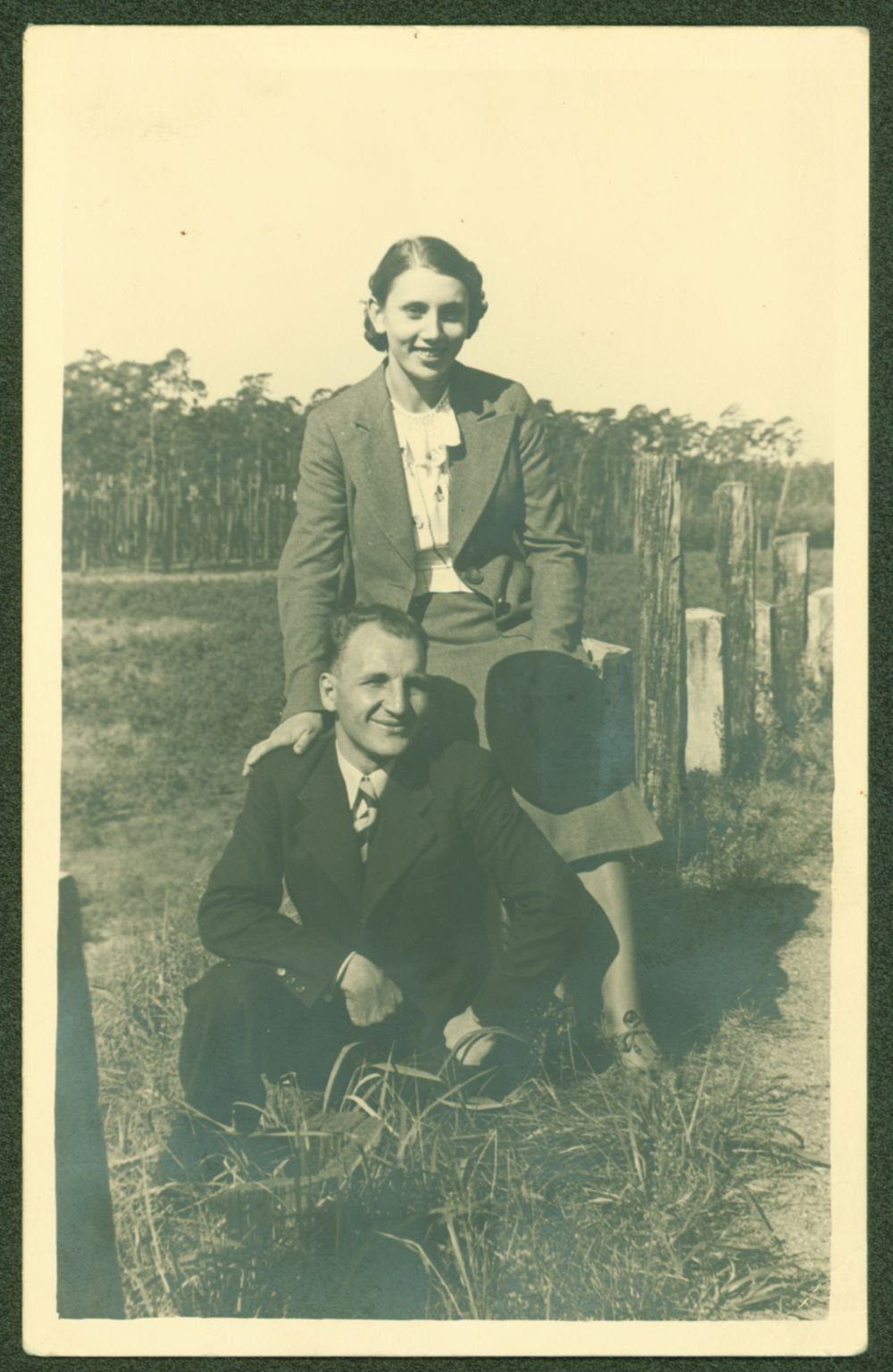
Halina and husband Dezydery, before 1939

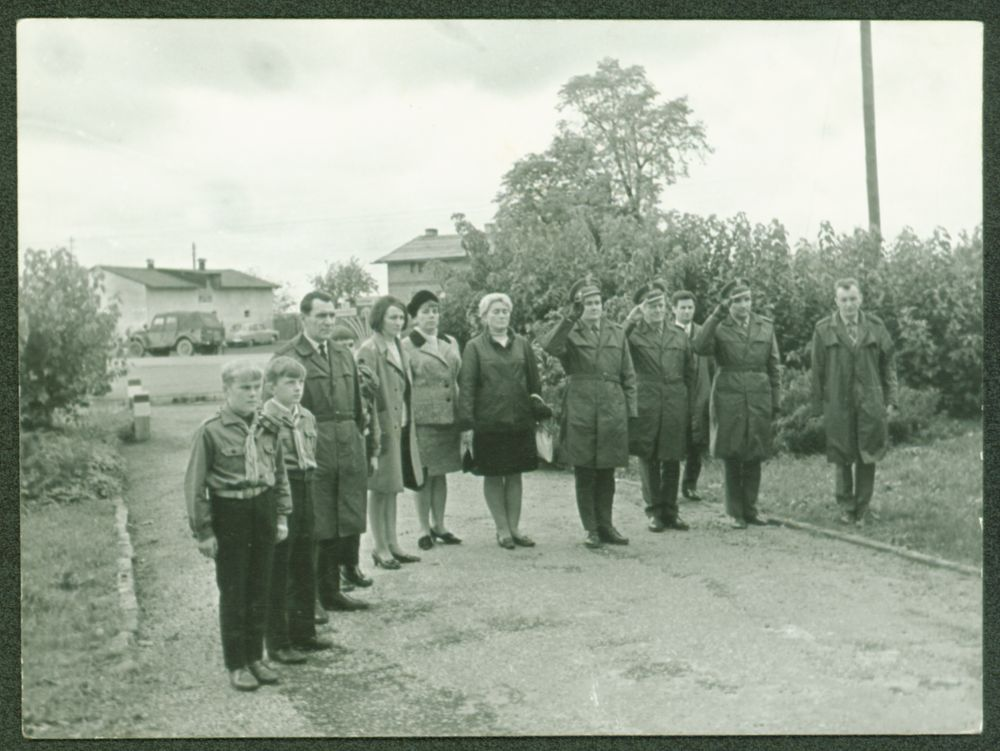
Ceremony near Oświęcim, 1968

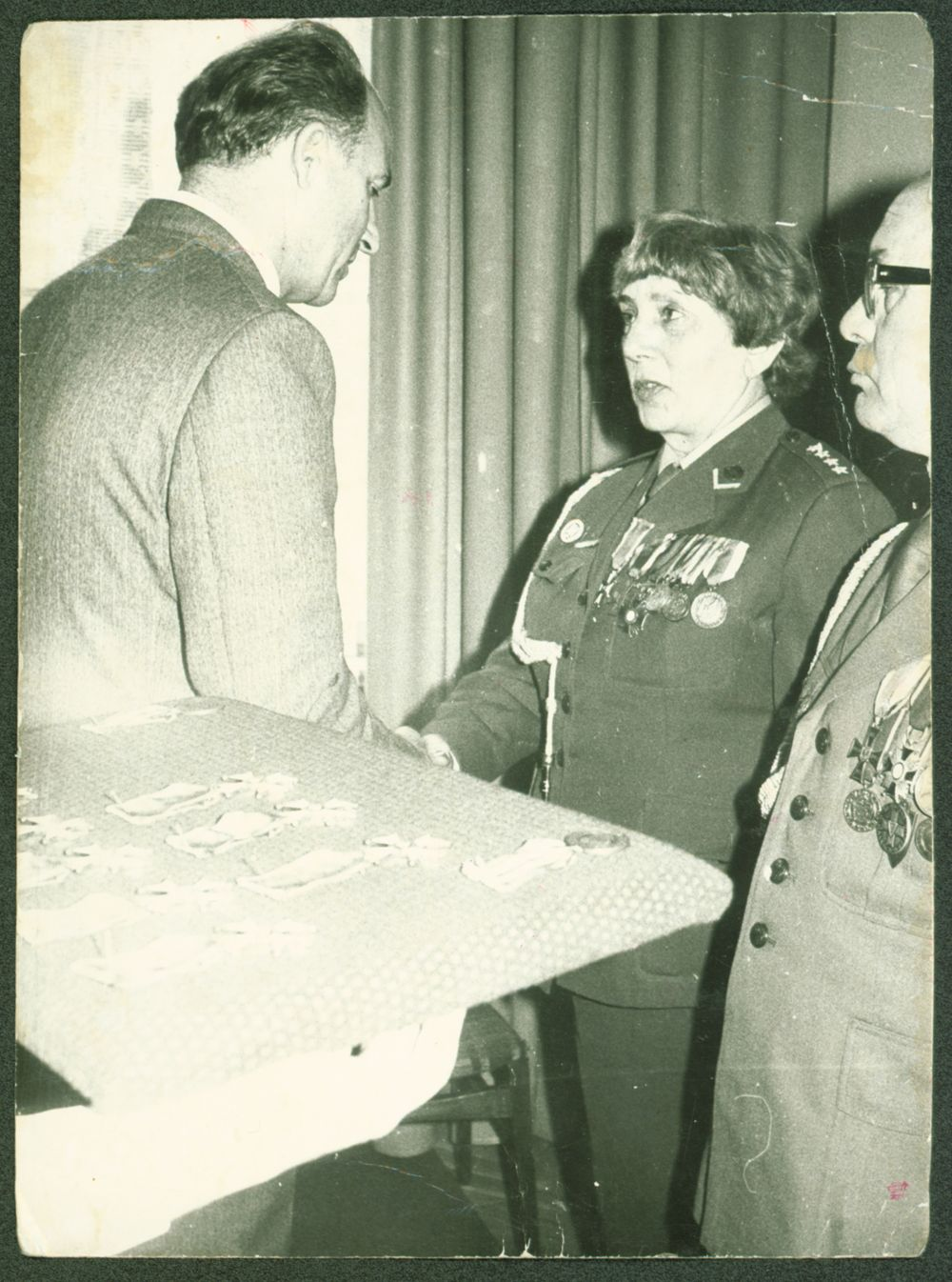
Ceremony of Cavalry cross award, 1980

== See also ==
- Bydgoszcz
- Nowofarny Cemetery in Bydgoszcz
- Warsaw Uprising
- Home Army

== Bibliography ==
- "INFORMATOR O ZBIORACH ARCHIWALNYCH FUNDACJI GENERAŁ ELŻBIETY ZAWACKIEJ. ARCHIWUM I MUZEUM POMORSKIE ARMII KRAJOWEJ ORAZ WOJSKOWEJ SŁUŻBY POLEK - Halina Marianna Rutkowska" [GUIDE TO THE COLLECTIONS OF THE ARCHIVE OF THE FOUNDATION OF GENERAL ELŻBIETA ZAWACKA. POMERANIAN ARCHIVES OF THE HOME ARMY AND THE MILITARY SERVICE OF POLISH WOMEN - Halina Marianna Rutkowska] (PDF). kpbc.ukw.edu.pl (in Polish). Torun: Kujawska Pomorska Biblioteka Cyfrowa.
