= Augustyn Träger =

Polish-Austrian soldier and intelligence officer

Roman Träger
- Born: August 25, 1896; Kalnica Dolna, Austria-Hungary
- Died: April 22, 1957 (aged 60); Bydgoszcz, People's Republic of Poland
- Military career
- Allegiance: Armia Krajowa
- Nicknames: Sęk, Tragarz

Augustyn Träger (25 August 1896 – 22 April 1957), codenames Sęk (Knot) and Tragarz (Porter), was a Polish-Austrian soldier during World War I and an intelligence officer in interwar and German-occupied Poland. Along with his son, Roman Träger, he played an important role in obtaining intelligence on the German V-1 and V-2 missiles which were being tested on the island of Usedom in Pomerania. He passed the information along to the Polish resistance organization Home Army, which then passed it on to the Allies in London. This led to the Allied bombing of Peenemünde in Operation Hydra in 1943.

== Early life and interwar period ==
Augustyn Träger was born to Joseph Träger, originally from Austria, and Helana née Nowicka, in Kalnica Dolna in what was then part of the Austrian Partition of Poland. He initially fought in the Austrian Army during World War I and then joined Piłsudski's Polish Legions. During the interwar period, Träger became an agent of the military intelligence section of the Polish army. He was originally based in Bydgoszcz, where he worked as a merchant.

== World War II ==
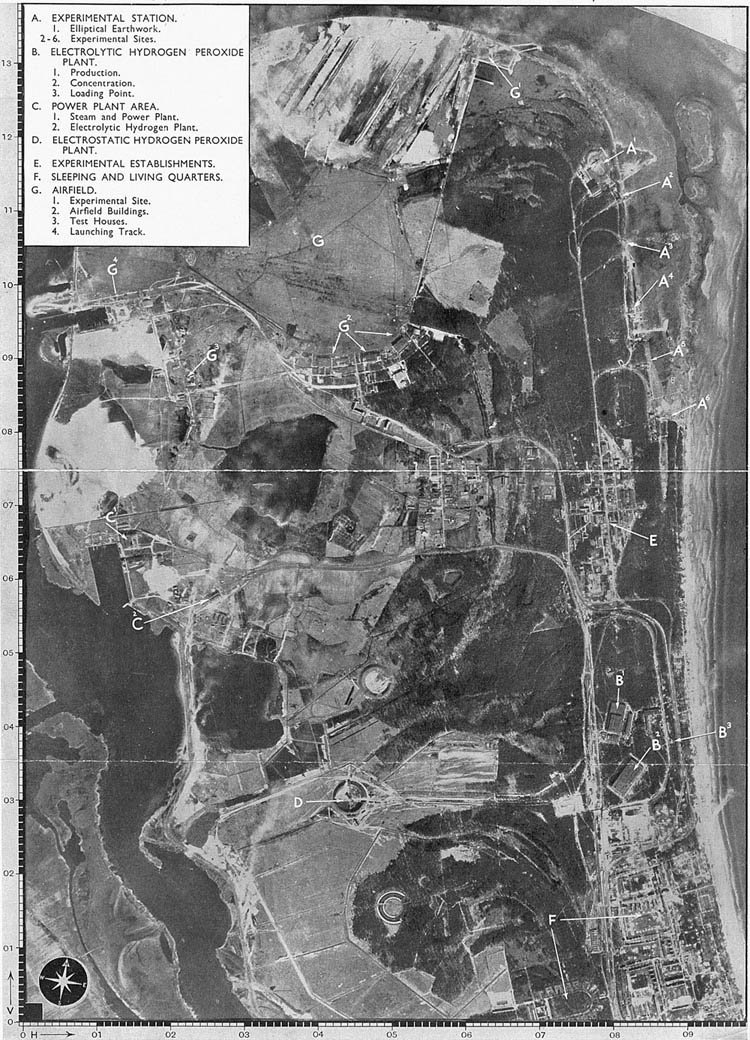
British plans for the bombing of the V-1 and V-2 testing facilities on Peenemünde. The bombing raid was a result of the intelligence supplied to the British by the Polish Home Army, based on reports by Roman and Augustyn Träger

Initially, right after the Nazi invasion of Poland, Träger became a member of the Polish anti-Nazi resistance group Miecz i Pług (Sword and Plough) (MiP) in Pomerania. He acquired German citizenship on the basis of his Austrian background while at the same time he became the head (starosta) of the intelligence section of the MiP, and also indirectly of the Home Army.

In July 1943 Augustyn participated, as an official representative of MiP, in a meeting with members of another anti-Nazi formation active in Pomerania, the Pomeranian Griffin. An agreement was reached to partially merge the two groups.

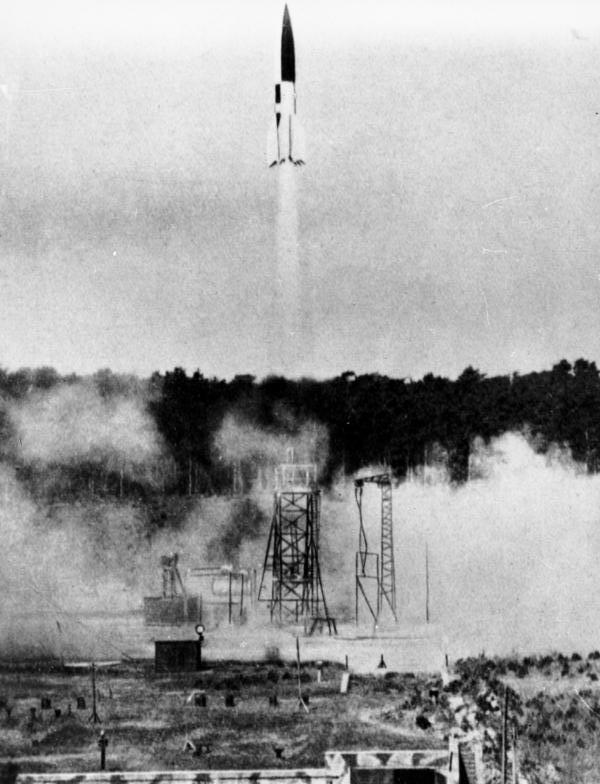
Launch of a V-2 rocket at the Peenemünde base in 1943, at which Augustyn Träger's son, Roman, was stationed

Early in 1943 Augustyn Träger's son, Roman, who was also a spy of the Polish Underground State obtained extensive information on the tests being carried out by the Germans of new Wunderwaffe ("Wonder Weapons") under the direction of Wernher von Braun on the island of Usedom, where Roman was stationed as a Wehrmacht soldier. Roman compiled detailed reports and passed them on to his father. In May 1943, Träger made his way clandestinely from Pomerania to Warsaw where he met with his contacts in the Home Army (specifically, intelligence department, Lombard) and transferred Roman's reports to them. The Home Army passed the reports on to the Polish government-in-exile in London which shared them with British intelligence. This led to the bombing raid on Peenemünde on the night of 17 August 1943.

Beginning in 1943, the Miecz i Pług organization had been infiltrated by Gestapo and the Home Army began suspecting some of its leaders of collaboration with the Germans. As a result, in September 1943, on the orders of the Home Army, two of MiP's leaders were executed, and the organization for all practical purposes was dissolved. However, Träger's intelligence unit was reconstituted within the structures of the Home Army, with most of its former MiP members, as a group codenamed Bałtyk-303 (Baltic-303), which was part of a wider intelligence network Bałtyk, associated with Home Army's Lombard, responsible for investigating and recording German activities around Bydgoszcz, Szczecin and Police. Towards the end of the war, Träger returned to Bydgoszcz where he continued his work as an intelligence agent.

== Post war ==
After the war, in July 1945, he was arrested by the NKVD and imprisoned by the Polish secret police, as part of a general communist reprisal against former soldiers of the Home Army, and other anti-Nazi (but non-communist) resistance groups. He was released from prison in 1946.

He died in Bydgoszcz in April 1957 and is buried in the cemetery of Saint Vincent de Paul, in the city. The Trägers' contribution to the fight against Nazi Germany was for a long time ignored in People's Republic of Poland, as official communist propaganda tried to minimize the role of the Home Army and other non-communist groups in fighting the Nazis. It was only in the 1970s, after some limited political and social reforms, that a commemorative plaque for both father and son was finally put up, at the kamienica in Wełniany Rynek (Wool Market) where Träger lived during the war.
