= Trager =

Trager is a surname. Notable people with the surname include:

- George L. Trager (1906–1992), American linguist
- Hannah Trager (1870–1943), English writer and activist
- Milton Trager, founder of Trager approach
- Philip Trager (born 1935), American photographer
- William Trager (1910–2005), American parasitologist

== Fictional characters ==
- Tig Trager in TV series Sons of Anarchy
- Kyle Trager and others in TV series Kyle XY
- Richard Trager in the Outlast video game

== See also ==
- Trager approach, a form of somatic education
- Trager Stadium, field hockey stadium at University of Louisville, USA
- Traeger, also Träger
