= Roman Träger =

- Born: 1923; Beuthen, Germany (now Bytom, Poland)
- Died: 1987 (aged 63–64); Bydgoszcz, People's Republic of Poland
- Military career
- Allegiance: Armia Krajowa
- Awards: Virtuti Militari, Cross of Grunwald

Roman Träger (March 17, 1923, in Beuthen (present-day Bytom) – March 21, 1987, in Bydgoszcz), codename "T2-AS" (for "Trager Junior-Ace"), was a Polish soldier and intelligence officer during the Nazi occupation of Poland.

He was the son of Augustyn Träger, who was also active in espionage against the Germans. Roman's biggest accomplishment was the compilation of reports about the German factory and testing facility of V-1 and V-2 rockets on the island of Usedom. After these reports were given to the Polish Armia Krajowa (Home Army), who in turn passed them on to British intelligence in London, the Allies bombed Peenemünde in Operation Hydra in 1943, killing two V-2 rocket scientists and delaying V-2 test launches by seven weeks.

== Early life ==
Roman was born on 17 March 1923 in Beuthen (present-day Bytom) as son of Augustyn Träger. Before the war the Träger family, of Austrian origins on Roman's grandfather's side, lived in Bydgoszcz.

== World War II ==
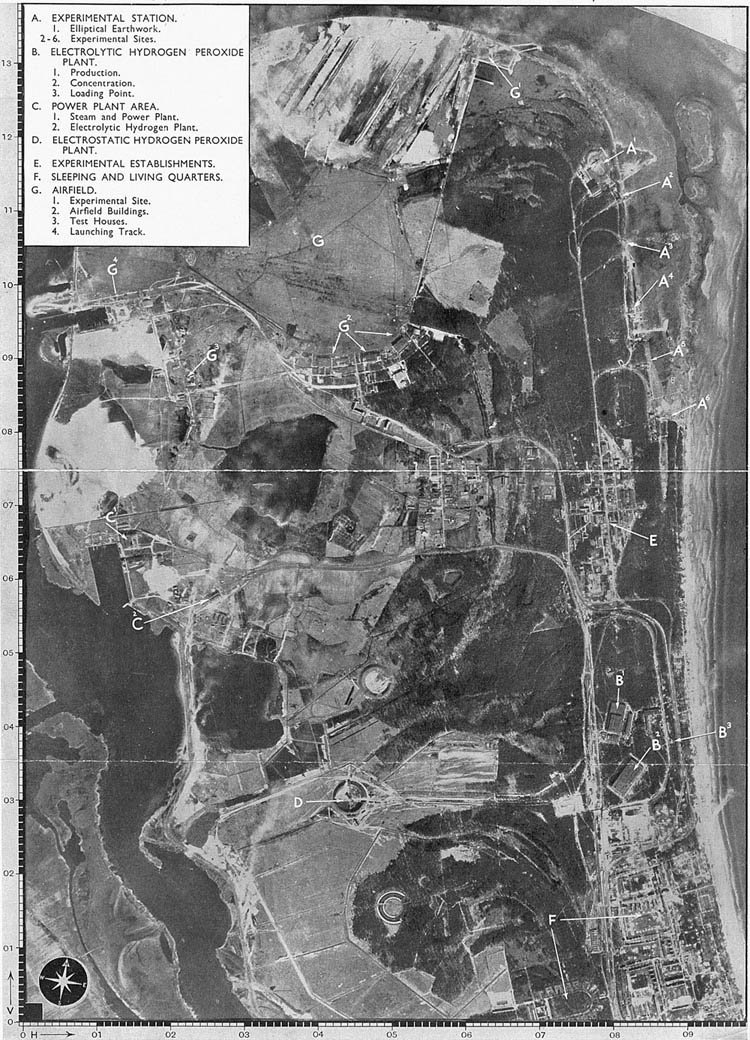
British plans for the bombing of Peenemunde, based in large part on Roman's reports.

After the German invasion of Poland, both Roman and his father acquired German citizenship in order to avoid expulsion by the Nazis to the General Government and to provide cover for espionage activities on part of the Polish resistance. Roman was drafted into the Wehrmacht and stationed on the island of Uznam, as a communications specialist. Träger was fairly unrestrained in his movements around the island, including in the factory and testing site of the V-1 and V-2 rockets, and soon began making sketches of the layout of various key structures.

Roman passed his reports on to his father who, in May 1943 traveled to Warsaw where he submitted them to the intelligence unit of the Home Army, codename Lombard. The reports were sent on to the Polish government in Exile in London and given to British Intelligence. The information provided by Roman, including a map of the facilities made by him, which indicated the objects which should be bombed, led the British to carry out a bombing raid on Peenemünde in August 1943 (see also Operation Crossbow).

== The fate of Roman's reports ==
There were initially several copies of Roman's report originally in existence. Four microfilm copies of the initial report prepared by Roman, were made by the Home Army's department Arka, a "Bureau for Industrial Studies", which was tasked with collecting and organizing information on German military production, factories, docks, iron works and experimental testing facilities. Another copy was the actual dossier on Peenemünde that was given to British Intelligence. All of these had been thought to have been lost. The British copies of the files that contained reports from Polish intelligence (over 100,000 reports) had been first buried somewhere in central London, and then completely disappeared.

Of the four copies made by the Home Army, one, hidden in the basement of former Arka workers Hanna and Adam Mickiewicz, was accidentally destroyed by Soviet soldiers who were billeted at the Mickiewiczes' home and used the basement as a latrine and waste dump. Another copy was buried in the ground, but soon after the war a housing project was constructed on top of the site. A third copy was burned by its holder who was afraid of being imprisoned if it were found by the Polish Communist Secret Police or the NKVD; during the Stalinist era in Poland, former Home Army were persecuted by the authorities and the microfilm would have been proof that he had been a member of the organization. The fourth copy survived however, sewn into Hanna's corset and was not found despite several searches of the Mickiewiczes' home and the arrest of Adam (he was released after Stalin's death in 1953 during the resulting period of political liberalization). Based on these experiences Hanna kept the existence of the final microfilm secret for many years, to keep appearances wore the corset in everyday life, and did not come forward with the information until after the fall of communism, in 1991. When finally recovered many of the microfilms had sweat stain on them and some were unreadable. The recovery took several years; the first restored documents were not available until 1999.

== After the war ==
The Trägers' contribution to the fight against Nazi Germany was for a long time ignored in People's Republic of Poland, as official communist propaganda tried to minimize the role of the Home Army and other non-communist groups in fighting the Nazis. It was only in the 1970s, after some limited political and social reforms, that a commemorative plaque for both father and son was finally put up, at the kamienica in Wełniany Rynek (Wool Market) where Augustyn lived during the war.

Likewise, in Britain the role of Roman and his father was for a long time unknown, because the files had been lost, and because the MI 6 downplayed the Polish contribution in order to emphasize its own role in the bombing of Peenemünde. According to Jan Nowak-Jeziorański, a Polish activist and politician in the UK and United States, according to British sources, this was because of competition among the various branches of British intelligence, each of which tended to exaggerate its own accomplishments at the expense of the others. However, after the discovery of the microfilms in Hanna's corset, and their recovery, a joint Polish-British Historical Commission for Study of the Documentation of the Activities of Polish Intelligence Services During World War II was established and published two volumes on the subject. Among others, these works included the story on how exactly the information which led to the bombing of the V-1 and V-2 testing facilities had been obtained.

Roman died in 1987 in Bydgoszcz and is buried at Cmentarz Nowofarny in the city.
