= Bydgoszcz Financial Centre =

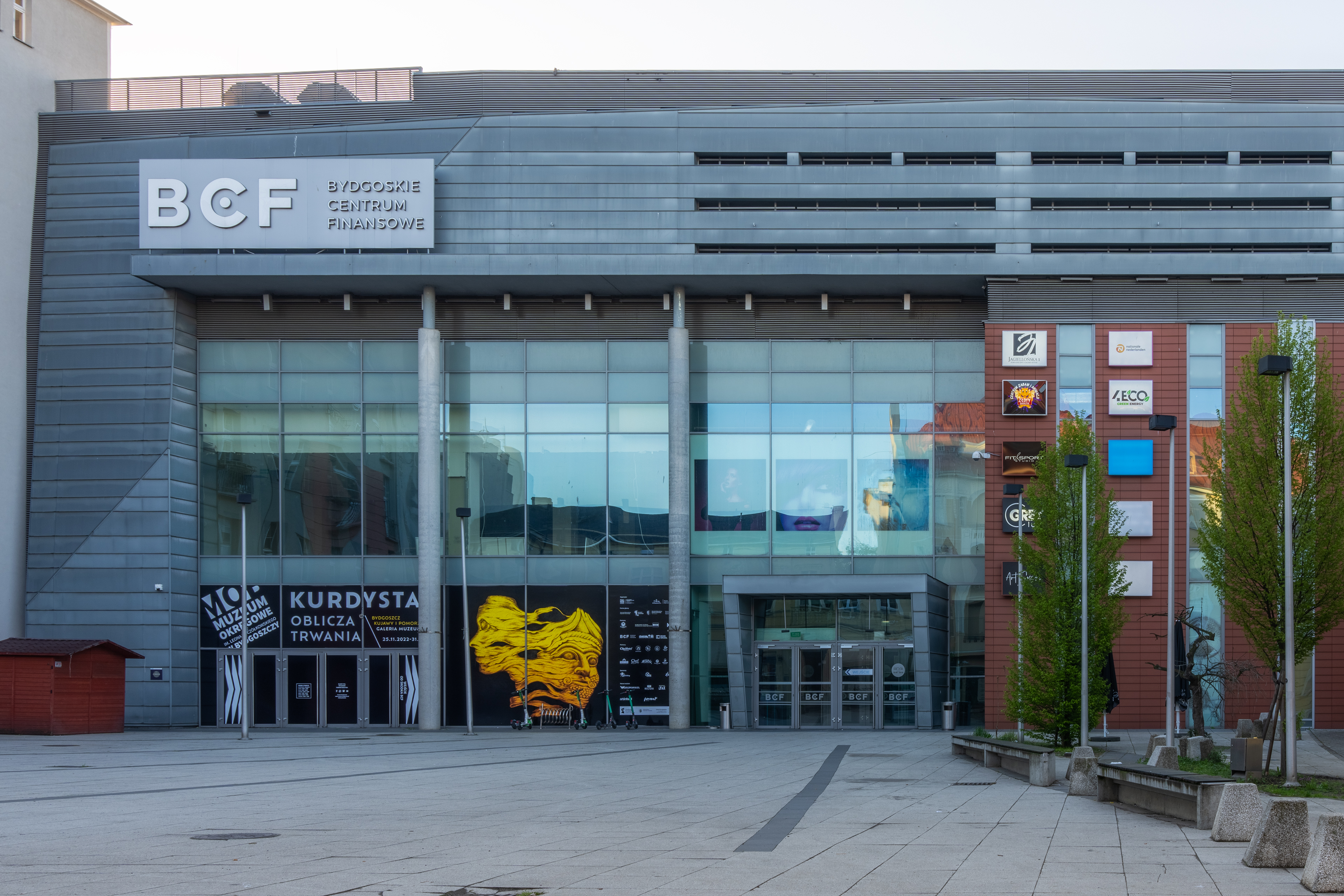
- View from Gdanska Street
- Interactive map of the Bydgoszcz Financial Centre area

General information
- Type: Shopping Center
- Location: Bydgoszcz, Poland, 1 Jagiellońska Street
- Coordinates: 53°7′29″N 18°0′12″E
- Opened: 30 November 2007

Design and construction
- Architecture firm: JSK Architects

Other information
- Parking: 3 levels

Website
- drukarniadommody.pl

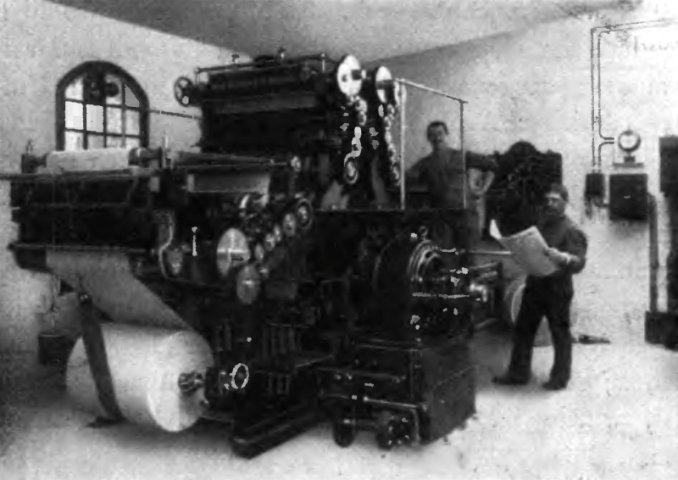
Printing machine cir. 1907 - Picture from "Industrie und Gewerbe in Bromberg"

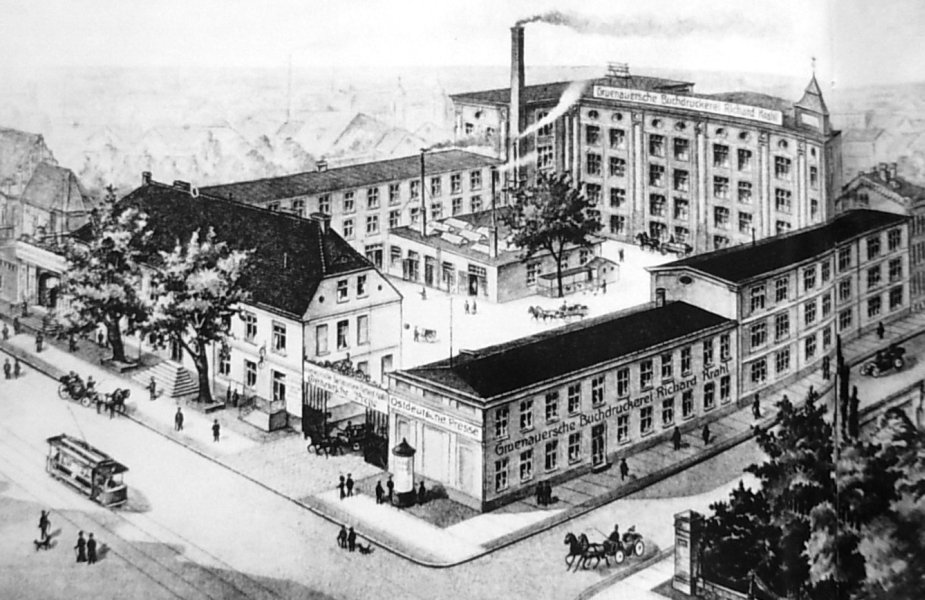
Printing House "Grunauer" in 1912 after expansion

Bydgoszcz Financial Centre is an official building in Bydgoszcz, Poland.

== Location ==
The Drukarnia shopping centre is located between Gdańska Street and Jagiellońska street in downtown district of Bydgoszcz.

== History ==
The site has housed printing factories, from the 19th century till 2005.

=== Prussian period ===
The first printing house was established on October 6, 1806, when Jan Adam Kimmel transferred his workshop from Toruń. His stepson, Andrzej Friedrich Gruenauer (1764–1829) inherited the charge. First location of the factory was 35 Poznanski Street in Bromberg. It was the only printing house in the city at that time; since Bromberg was the seat of the region, there was a great need for various types of official prints. Hence, the company was thriving. In 1814, needing to expand production into different types of printed journals, Gruenauer purchased a portion of a monastery garden within the congregation of the Poor Clares in Bydgoszcz. From there, he began construction of a modernized printing house. Launched in May 1815, this building occupied the site where the shopping mall stands today. The neoclassical building still stands on Jagiellońska street, close to the Church of the Poor Clares where printing continuously operated until 2005.

Grünauer's print house issued a range of official documents, from Bydgoszcz's first newspaper, to the 1807 Constitution of the Duchy of Warsaw. Railway timetables were also printed here from 1850.

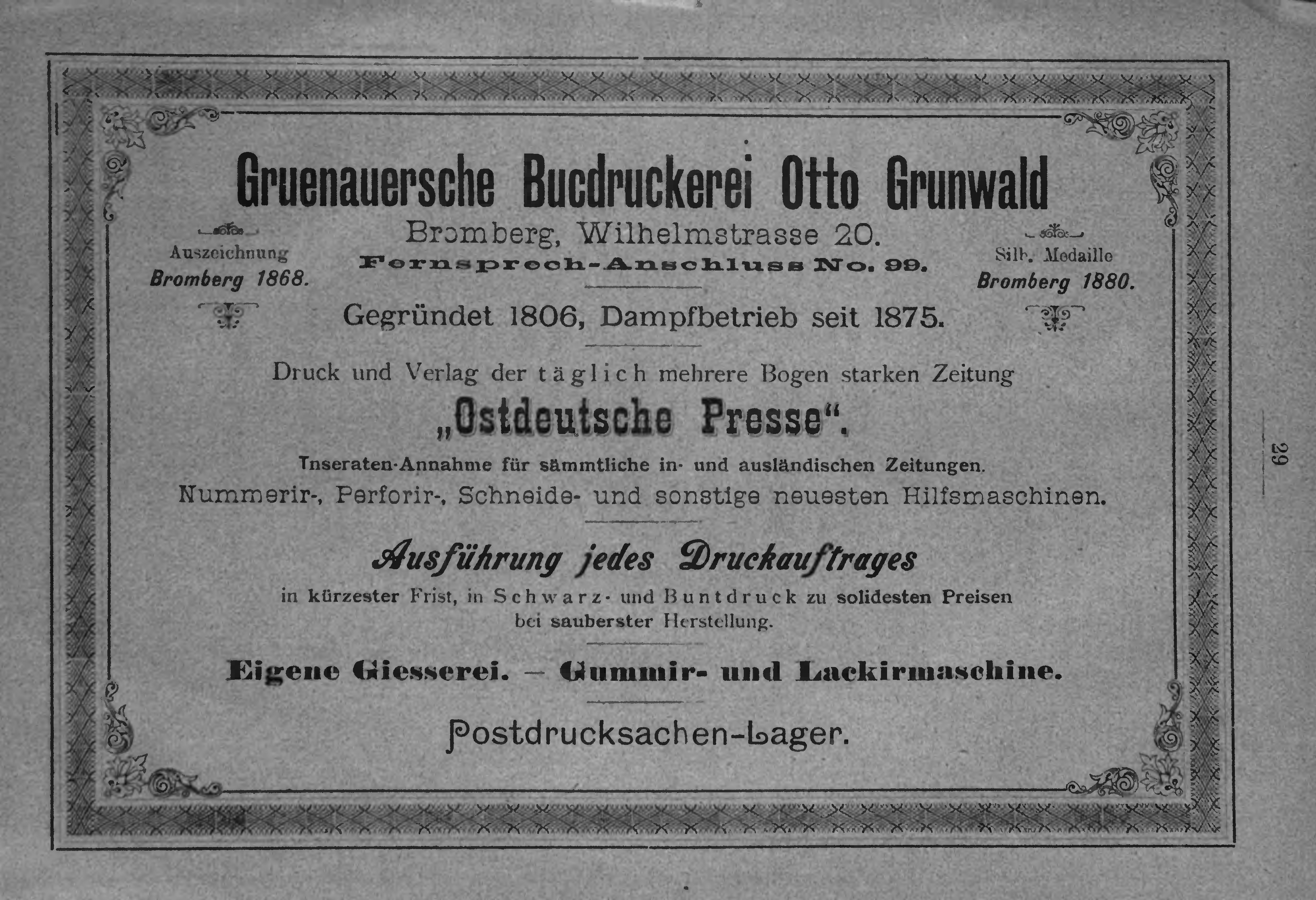
Advertisement for Gruenauer's Print house - ca 1890

The plant was modernized in the 19th century: between 1845 and 1874 a lithography section emerged, and by 1875 a steam engine powered the factory. In 1899-1900 a three-story factory building was added on the northern side, designed mainly for the bookbinding department. It was built with a gaslight system.

The printing house employed 75 people in 1831, 136 in 1896 and reached 230 employees just before World War I. Despite many ownership changes, the plant was still called Printing House Gruenauer in 1920 (German: Grunauerische Buchdruckerei).

=== Interwar period ===
In 1918, the house changed its name to Printing Plant Institute-Library of Poland (Polish: Zakłady Graficzne w Bydgoszczy-Zakłady Graficzne Instytutu Wydawniczego). It was the largest and most modern printing plant in Bydgoszcz and one of the largest in Poland. In 1920, the plant was bought by Władysław Kościelski (1886–1933), a relative of Józef Weyssenhoff. New owner's goal was to issue textbooks, scholarly works, fiction, Polish and foreign scientific journals, art reproductions, maps, and other publications. After the death of Władysław Kościelski, Henryk Leon Strasburger directed the factory.

In the years 1921-1924 and 1935–1939, the printing house developed new areas of competence, such as offset printing, zincography, rotogravure, and became self-sufficient in equipment repair. This was made possible, among other things, by the acquisition in 1928 of a printing press housed in building adjacent to Bydgoszcz's jail facility at Parkowa street. In 1936, the printing facility had more than 200 machines and employed around 280 people, which represented more than 60% of the employees of the printing industry in the former Pomeranian province. In 1939, the number of employees increased to more than 600 people.

=== World War II ===
During the occupation, German troops destroyed 44 machines, and claimed over 20 of the most valuable ones. They liquidated the rotogravure department, thus limiting printing activity to newspapers and ephemera publishing. After the war, a commemorative brass plaque was placed on the printing house's Gdanska street side: it mentions the names of Bydgoszcz printers, booksellers, librarians and journalists murdered by the Nazis during World War II.

=== Post-war period ===
In early January 1945, after the liberation of Bydgoszcz, the facility provided military printing, and published the first new city newspapers: Wiadomości Bydgoskich (Messages of Bydgoszcz), Ziemi Pomorskiej (Land of the Pomerania) and Ilustrowany Kurier Polski (Illustrated Mail of Poland). At the same time it started to issue its first textbooks, teaching aids, maps and other school documents. Its first color manual was published in 1949. The facility had major expansions in 1947–1951, led by Jan Kossowski, and 1957–1962. At that point, the print house was the largest one in Poland for textbooks and educational magazines. Approximately 20 million books and teaching aids were issued every year: more than half of all Polish-printed textbooks. Even in the 1980s, these printing plants provided over 40% of national production of textbooks (18 million units per year).

Despite further modernizations of the print house in the late 1980s and 1990s, social and economic changes in Poland reduced production, and the company faced fierce market competition. In 1993–1995, employment decreased by 20% to 600 people. In 2001, the company was still one of the largest printing facilities in Poland (130 employees). In the following years, the growth of global competition in the printing industry worsened its financial situation.

In May 2005, the building at Jagiellońska street was bought by Opus 2 Investment Company, which built, in 2006–2007, the shopping mall Drukarnia at this location. The opening of the mall took place on 30 November 2007. Originally called "Astoria" it was renamed to "Drukarnia", in honor of the history of the site.

In early 2016, the complex was bought by ASK Consulting, which decided to transform the building into a business center, Bydgoskie Centrum Finansowe.

== Features ==
The centre houses shops, galleries and multi-level indoor parking. Inside are an ellipse-shaped escalator, two panoramic lifts, and shops, including restaurants and a pastry shop. By the Gdanska street entrance there is a town square, which hosts occasional events and exhibitions.

Drukarnia houses over 50 internationally branded shops - clothing, jewelry, home furnishings, cafes, and a fitness club. The lowest floor is a Tesco supermarket.

Specifications:

- Size: 24 500 m ^{2}
- Volume: 110 120 m ^{3}
- Number of floors Commercial: 3
- Number of floors of parking: 3
- Number of parking spaces: 135

== Gallery ==
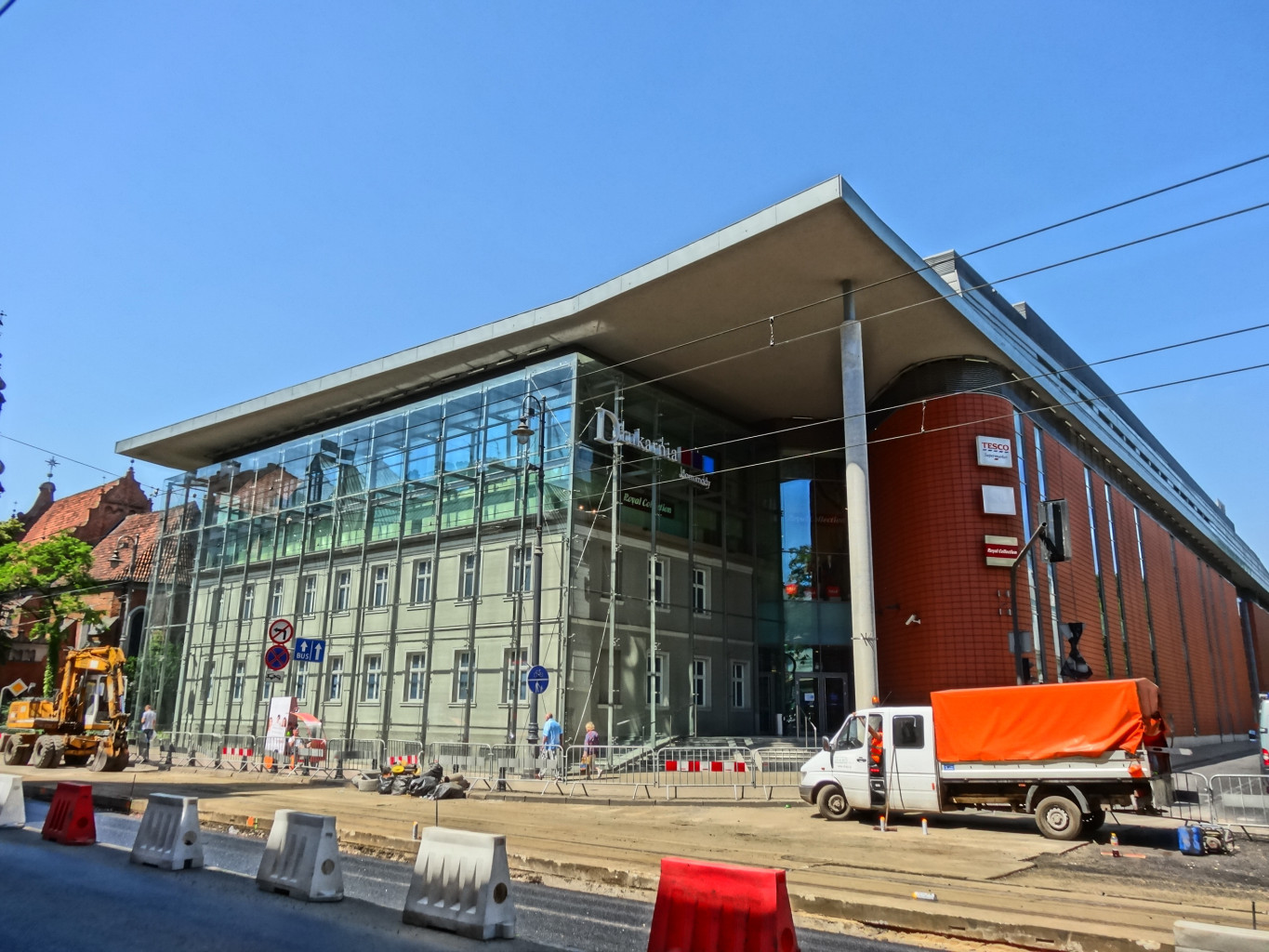
View from Jagiellońska street, with old printing building behind glass walls

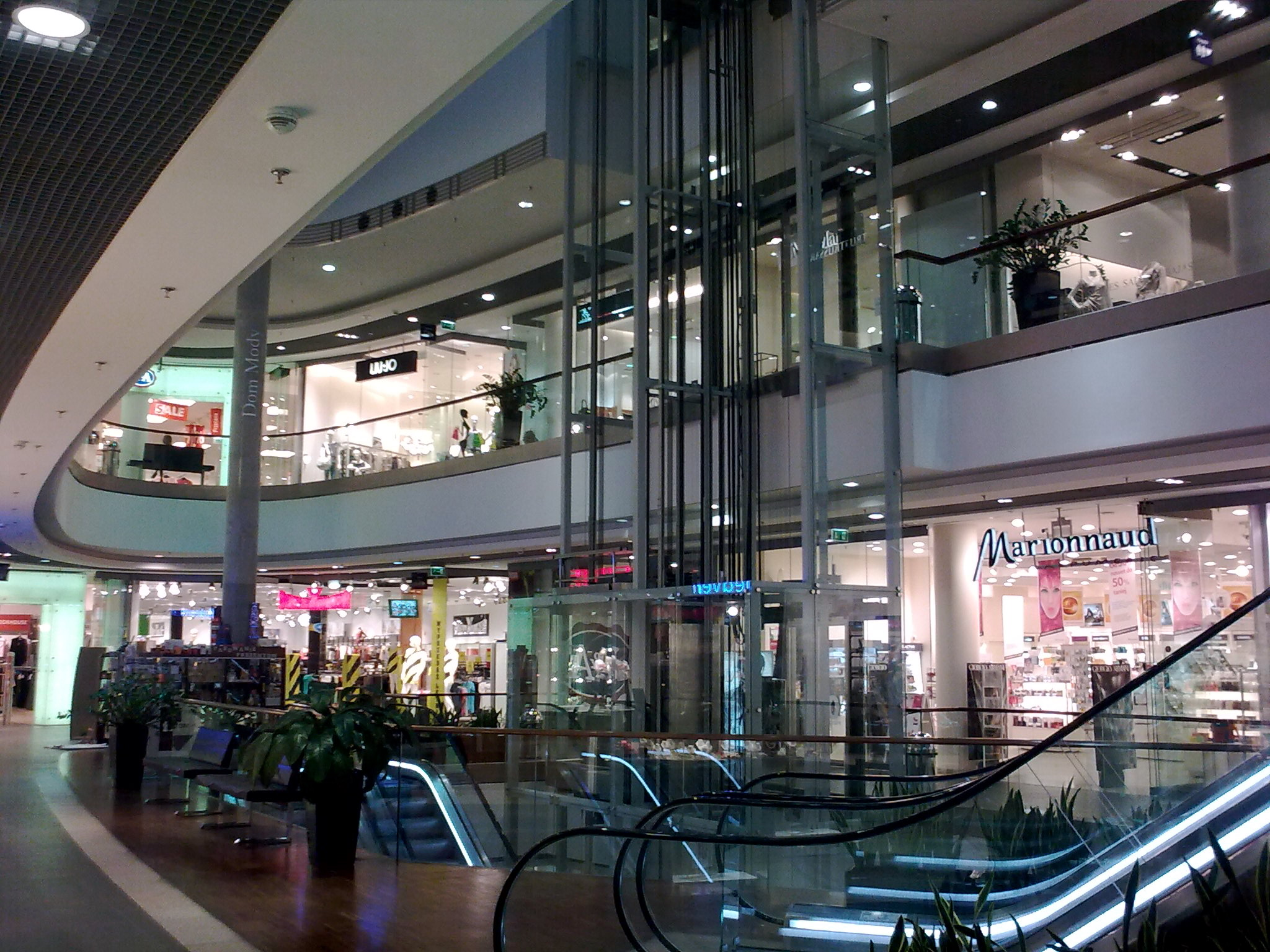
Interiors

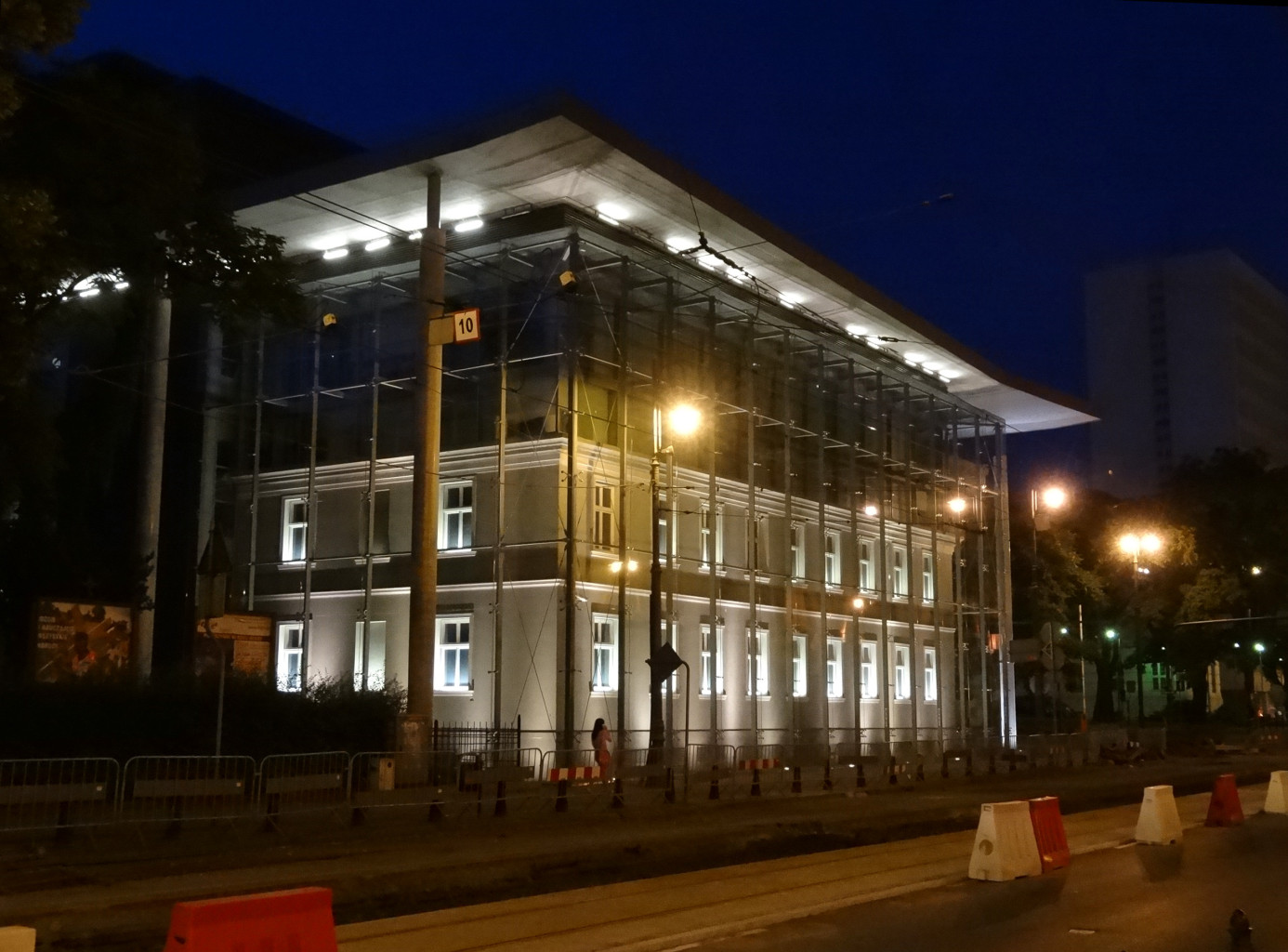
By night

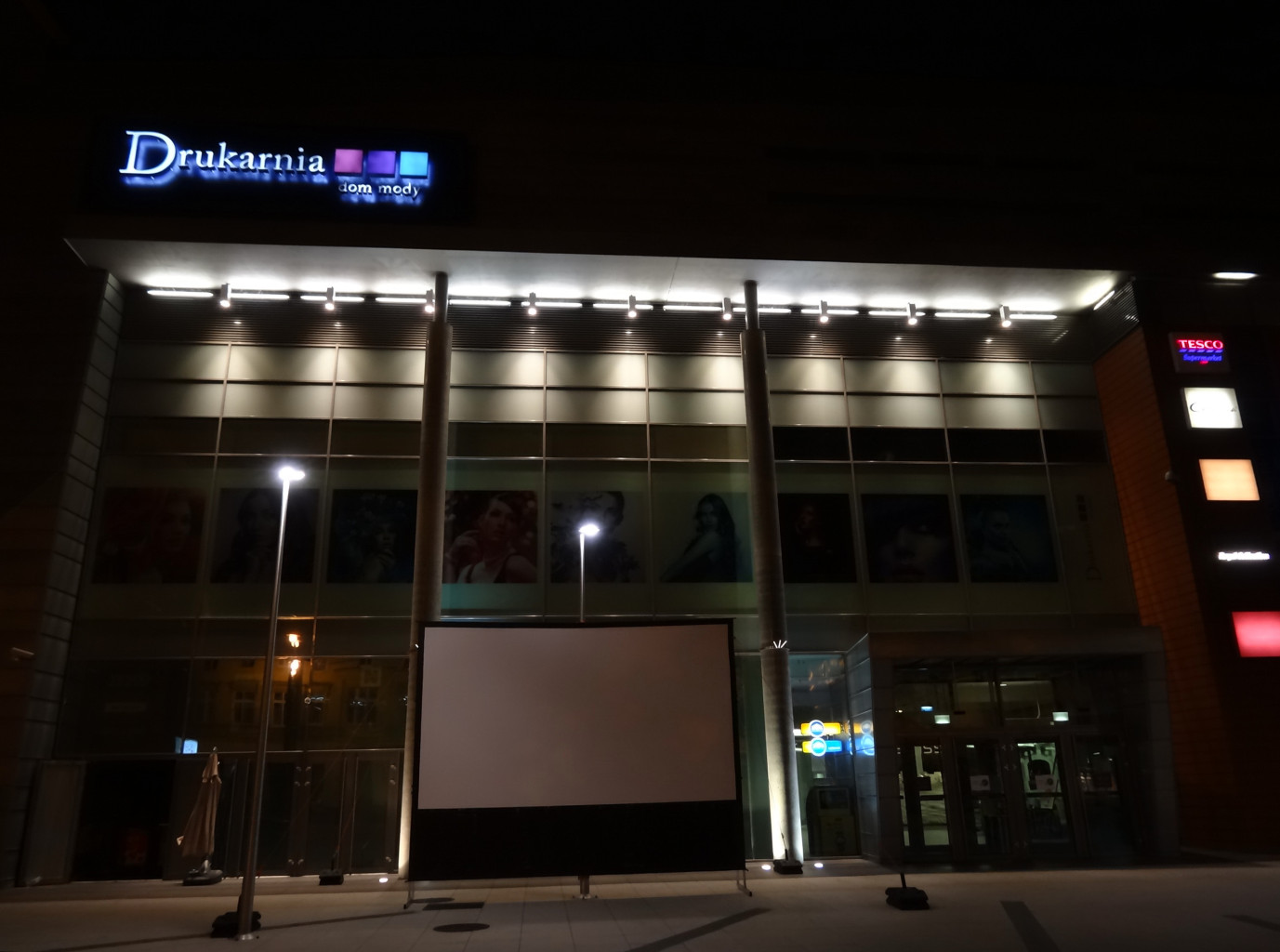
By night from town square on Gdanska street

== Bibliography ==
- (in Polish) Długosz, Jerzy (1992). Zakłady Graficzne im. Komisji Edukacji Narodowej. Kalendarz Bydgoski. Bydgoszcz: Towarzystwo Miłośników Miasta Bydgoszczy. pp. 191–195.
- (in Polish) Rak, Mieczysław (1971). 150-lecie Zakładów Graficznych w Bydgoszczy. Kronika Bydgoska II. Bydgoszcz: Towarzystwo Miłosnikow Miasta Bydgoszczy - Bydgoskie Towarzystwo Naukowe. pp. 63–68.
- (in Polish) Umiński, Janusz (2010). Zakłady graficzne. Kalendarz Bydgoski. Bydgoszcz: Towarzystwo Miłośników Miasta Bydgoszczy.
