= Alfred Messel =

German architect

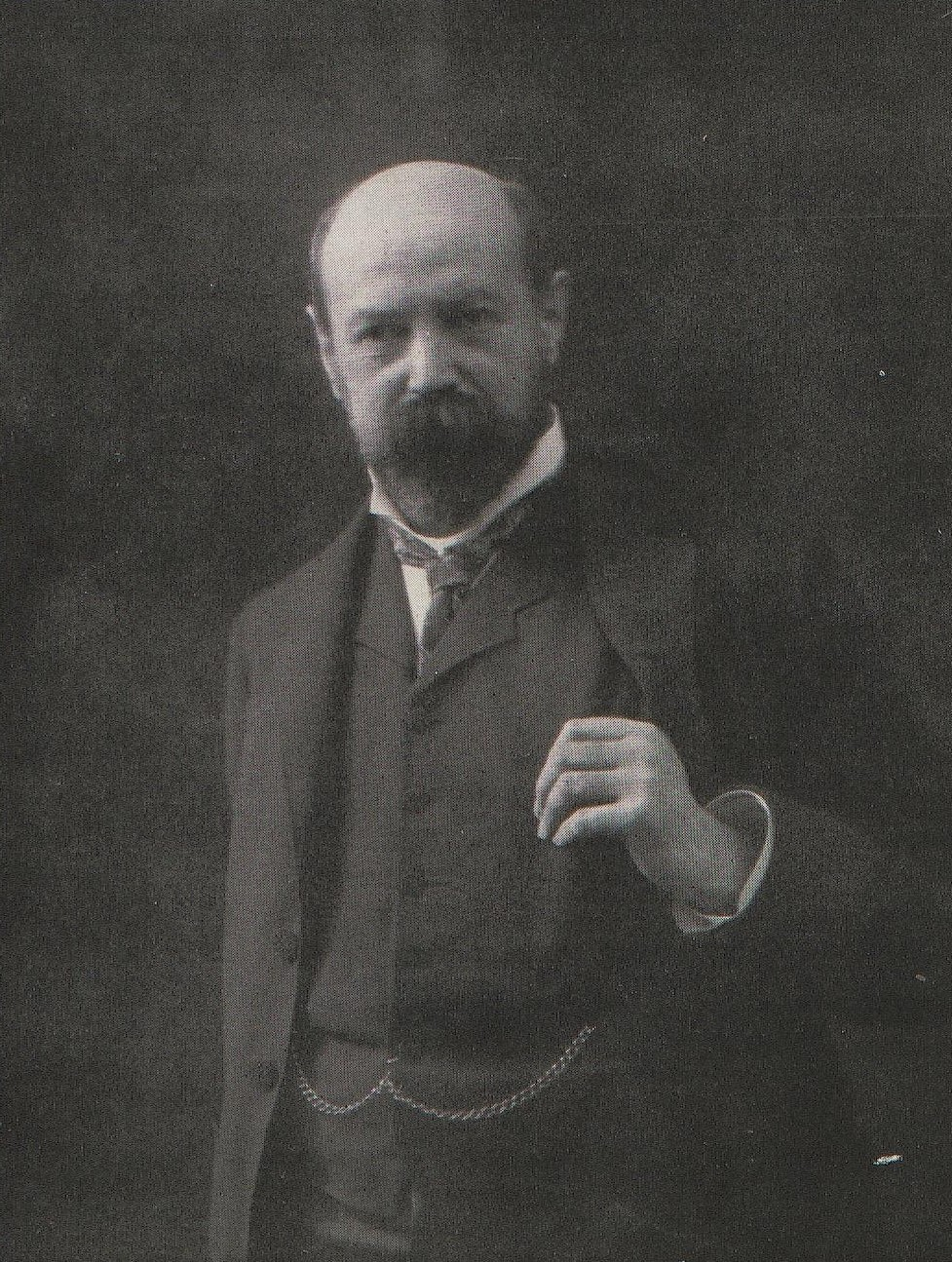
- Messel, c. 1900
- Born: 22 July 1853; Bruck an der Mur, Austria
- Died: 24 March 1909 (aged 55)
- Occupation: Architect

Alfred Messel (22 July 1853 – 24 March 1909) was a German architect at the turning point to the 20th century, creating a new style for buildings which bridged the transition from historicism to modernism. Messel was able to combine the structure, decoration, and function of his buildings, which ranged from department stores, museums, office buildings, mansions, and social housing to soup kitchens, into a coherent, harmonious whole. As an urban architect striving for excellence he was in many respects ahead of his time. His best known works, the Wertheim department stores and the Pergamon Museum in Berlin, reflect a new concept of self-confident metropolitan architecture. His architectural drawings and construction plans are preserved at the Architecture Museum of Technische Universität Berlin.

== Early life and career ==
Messel was the third son of the German Jewish banker Simon Messel (1817–1859) and his wife Emilie (née Lindheim, 1825–1889). The family owned in Darmstadt the bank ″Aron Messel & Co.″ (established 1816). Alfred's elder brother Ludwig emigrated to the United Kingdom and founded in 1873 in London the stockbroker ″L. Messel & Co.″ (sold to Lehman Brothers in 1986). In his youth, Alfred began a lifelong friendship with Ludwig Hoffmann, who later became a Berlin city planning official. In 1872, Messel graduated from the Ludwig-Georgs-Gymnasium in Darmstadt with an Abitur, after which he served in the military as a one-year volunteer in the First Grand Ducal Hessian Royal Guard Infantry Regiment.

In 1873, he attended the Kassel art academy together with his friend Ludwig Hoffmann, followed by architectural studies at the Berlin Bauakademie (which would later become the Technische Hochschule Charlottenburg) under Heinrich Strack and Richard Lucae. As a civil service trainee, he then contributed to a new post office administration building on Spandauer Straße in Berlin designed by the architect Carl Schwatlo, before successfully passing his second state examination qualifying him as an assessor. In 1879, Messel became a member of the Berlin Architects Society and, in 1881, he won the prestigious Schinkel Prize for his plans for an exhibition building on the Tempelhofer Feld, a military parade ground in southern Berlin.

Over the next two years, he traveled extensively through France, Spain, Italy and Great Britain and was a lecturer at the newly founded Technische Hochschule in Charlottenburg (now Technische Universität Berlin). In 1886, he took a leave of absence from the civil service to work as a private architect. On 1 February 1893, he married Elsa Altmann and in November of that year their first child, Ena, was born. In February 1894, he was appointed professor at the Berlin School of Fine Arts and in the same year founded an architectural firm together with Martin Altgelt. His first buildings were on the Werderschen Markt in Berlin and, from 1893, he worked with the Wertheim department store dynasty, erecting in 1894 in Berlin's Oranienstraße the first department store in Germany to follow the French model. In 1896, his son Ludwig Leonhard was born (died during World War I).

In 1899, Messel converted from Judaism to Protestantism. On 17 May, that year he received the Order of the Red Eagle, 4th Class, which caused him to quip that from that date he could really feel “fourth class”. Also that year, his youngest daughter Irene was born (died 1992 in London). In 1900, he terminated his collaboration with Martin Altgelt. Beginning in 1902, he suffered from heart disease, which caused him to spend long periods at a health resort in the following years. He was busy with the second extension of the Wertheim store on Leipziger Platz in the period 1903 to 1906.

In 1906, Messel became a member of the Prussian Academy of Arts in Berlin and in 1906 was awarded an honorary doctorate (Dr.-Ing.E.h.) from the Technische Hochschule in Darmstadt (now Technische Universität Darmstadt). In 1907, he was officially appointed architect of the Royal Prussian Museums and worked until his death primarily on plans for a new building to house the German, Pergamon and Near East collections in Berlin.

Messel died on 24 March 1909 and was buried in the Alter St.-Matthäus-Kirchhof in Berlin-Schöneberg. Since he was of Jewish descent, city streets named after him were renamed during the Nazi era.

== Buildings ==
=== Wertheim department store, Leipziger Strasse ===
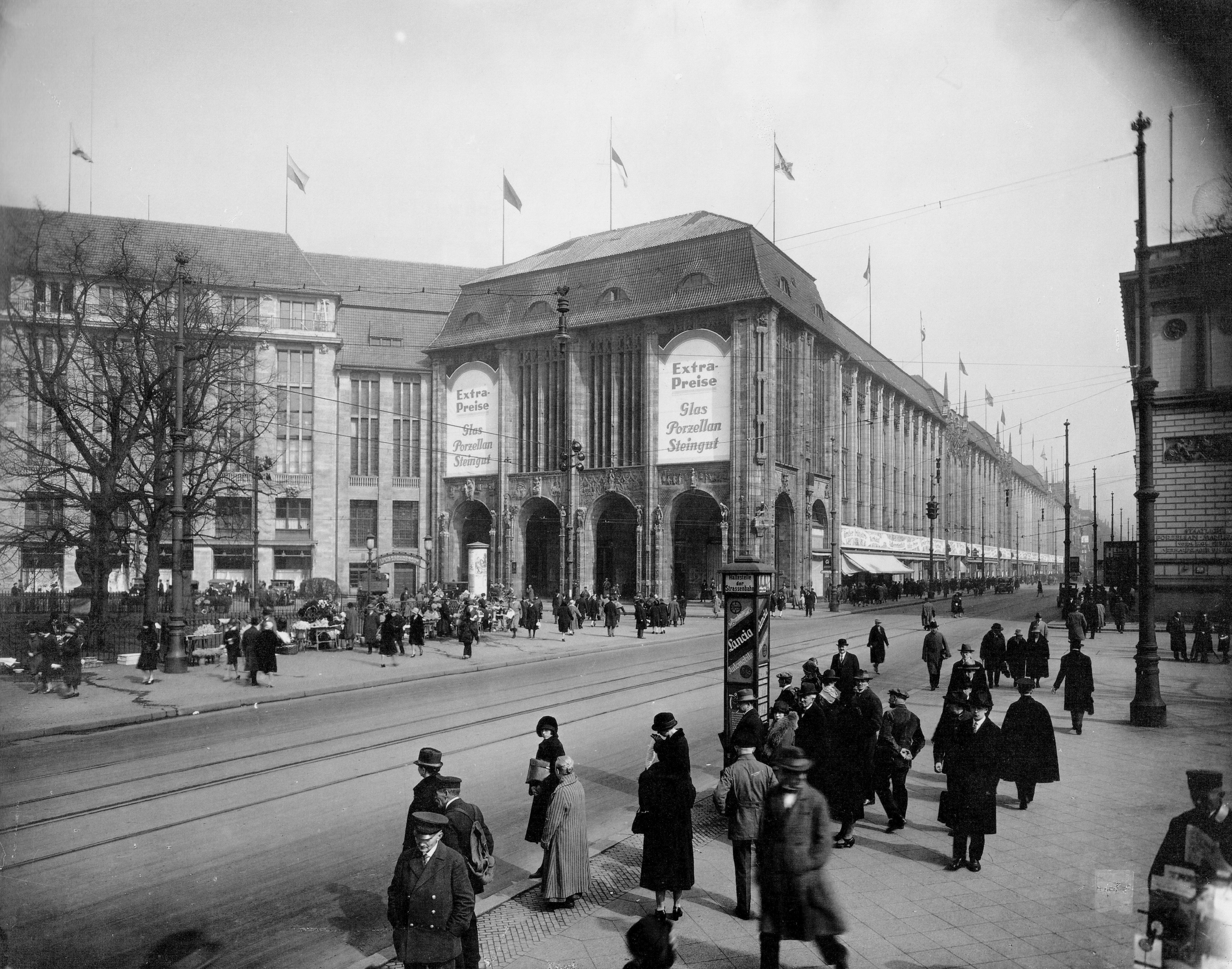
Messel's Wertheim department store on Leipziger Platz in the 1920s.

Between 1896 and 1906, Messel's executed the Wertheim Department store on Leipziger Platz. Already during construction, the nighttime electric lighting and steel scaffolding caused a sensation, and when the store opened on 15 November 15, 1897, the result was traffic chaos on Leipziger Strasse as well as the beginning of Messel's rise to become one of the most prominent German architects of his time.

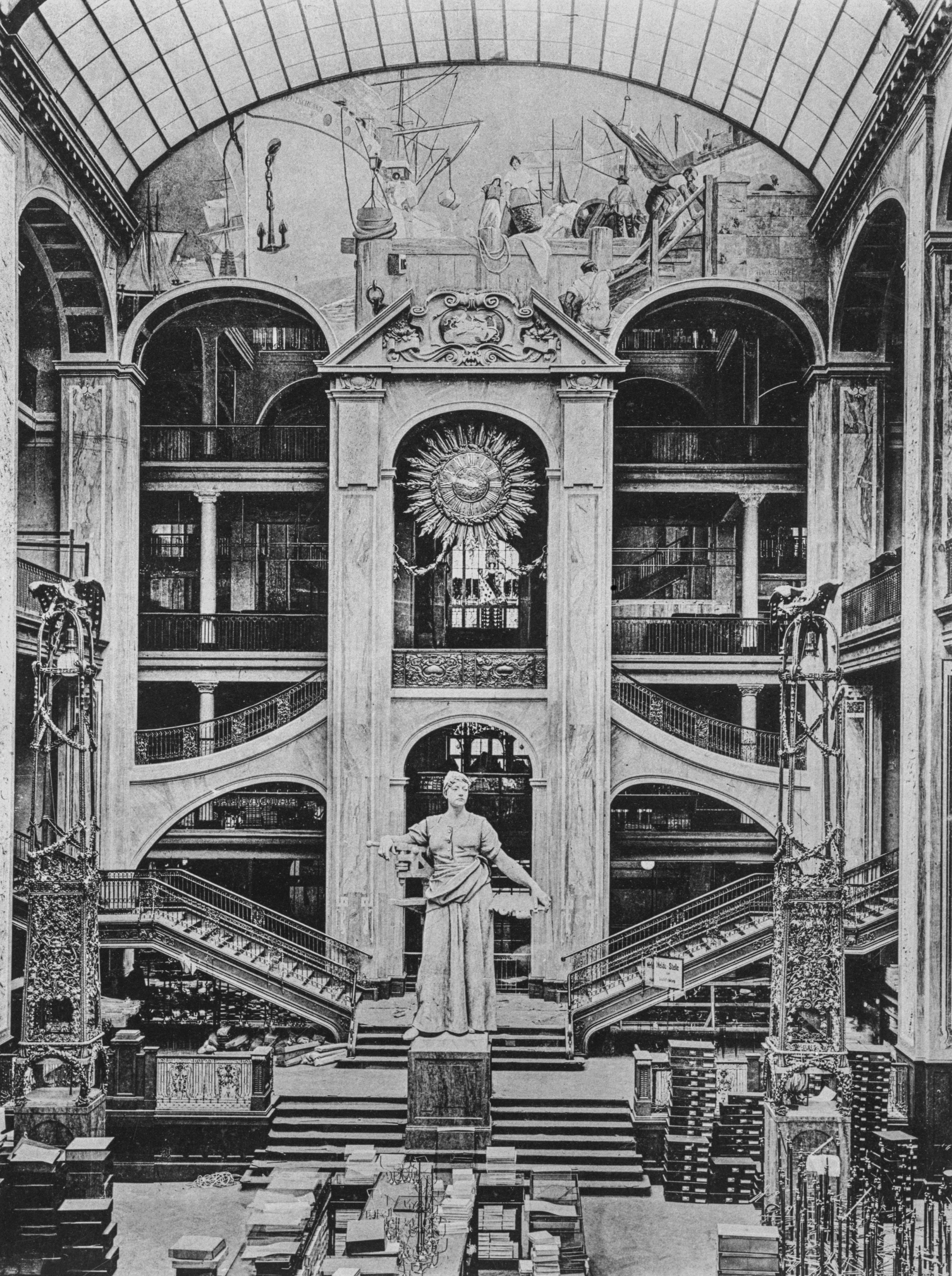
The lofty central hall of the store

The innovative, vertically structured facade of narrow pillars extending from the ground floor to the roof and interspersed with windows received high praise, not least because it alluded to the building's function. After passing through a vestibule two-storeys high, one entered a rectangular lightwell 22 meters high and 450 square meters in size. On the opposite wall an imposing stairway led to the upper sales floors. On the landing was a 6-meter-high (20 ft) statue symbolizing “Labor” by Ludwig Manzel, and the wall above was decorated with monumental frescoes showing an ancient harbor by Max Koch and a modern harbor by Fritz Gehrke.

The tremendous impact of the new department store on the general public as well as on architecture experts is documented in numerous newspaper and magazine articles and statements by famous architects and their critics. These included Peter Behrens, Henry van de Velde, August Endell, Bruno Taut, Ludwig Mies van der Rohe, Hermann Muthesius, Karl Scheffler, Walter Curt Behrendt, Fritz Stahl, Alfred Lichtwark, Wiener, Heinrich Schliepmann and many others.

The store did not survive World War II. In March 1943, it was damaged by three exploding bombs, and its final destruction was caused by a fire started by an incendiary bomb. The ruins were cleared away in 1955–56 to make way for a border strip demarcating the Russian sector of Berlin.

=== Pergamon Museum ===
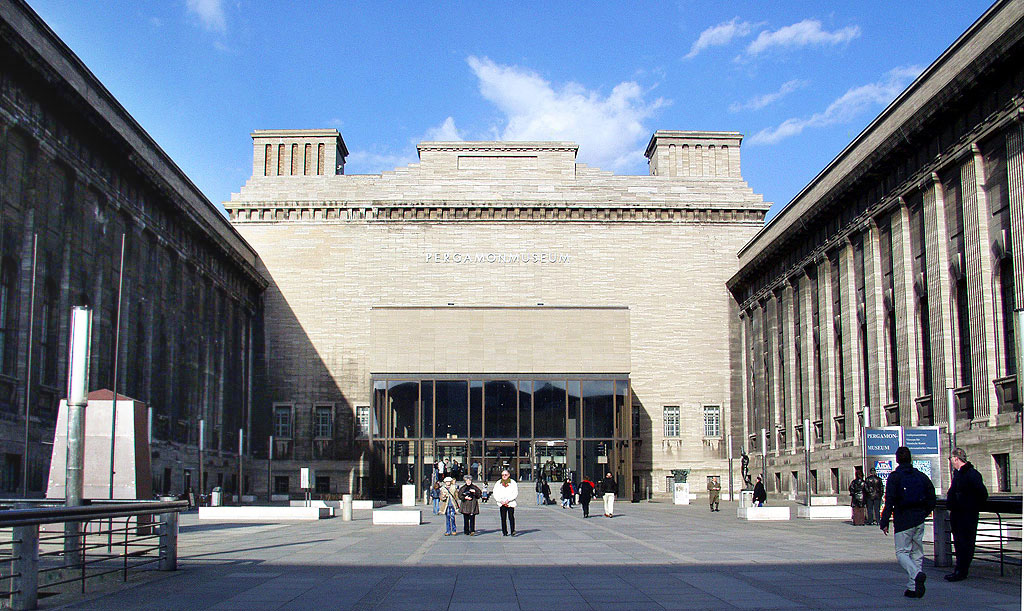
Entrance to the Pergamon Museum, Berlin

Messel had long been interested in the design plan for the Museum Island and since 1907 had been developing plans for the Pergamon Museum. It remains to this day the monumental, austere three-wing neoclassical construction which he conceived but did not live to see realized; he died in 1909. It was constructed with slight modifications between 1910 and 1930 under the supervision of Messel's close friend, the architect and city planning official Ludwig Hoffmann. The museum was badly damaged in World War II, and modifications of the building are being undertaken as part of the plan for Berlin's Museum Island.

The museum's external monumentality is in the same spirit as many of the relics on display inside, not least the reconstruction of the imposing western side of the Pergamon Altar itself with its three wings. The changes made by Hoffmann on the building's exterior had a restraining and moderating effect. The most noticeable were the raising of the eaves, the flattening of the pediment and the addition of a metope and triglyph frieze. Despite such smoothening interventions, the basic rigidity and blockiness which characterized Messel's last work was retained.

=== Other buildings (surviving, at least in part) ===
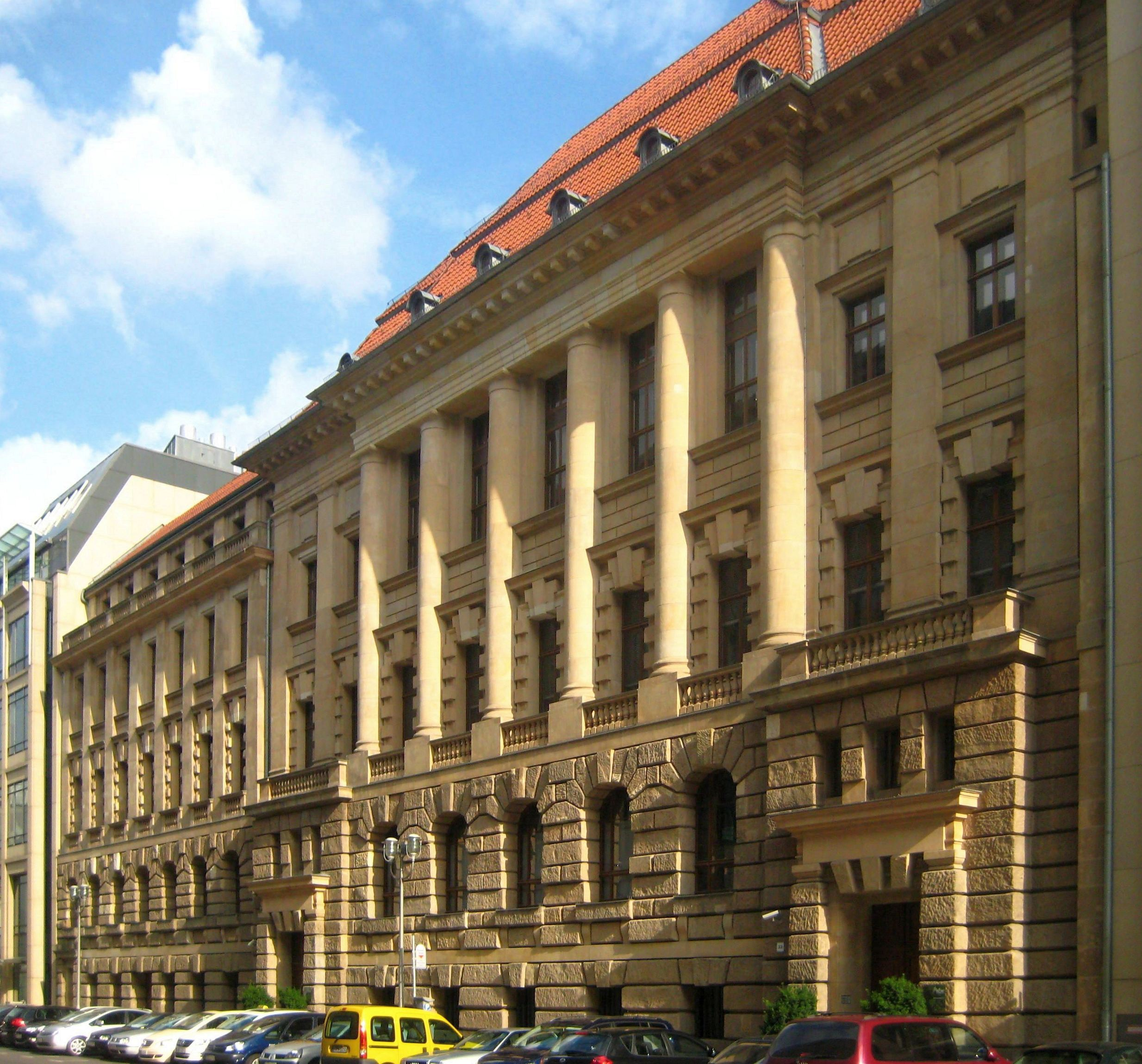
Messel's building for the Berliner Handelsgesellschaft at Behrenstraße No. 32, a typical example of the "bank palaces" in the architectural tradition of Italian Renaissance buildings constructed in Berlin at the time of the German Empire; now designated as a historic landmark

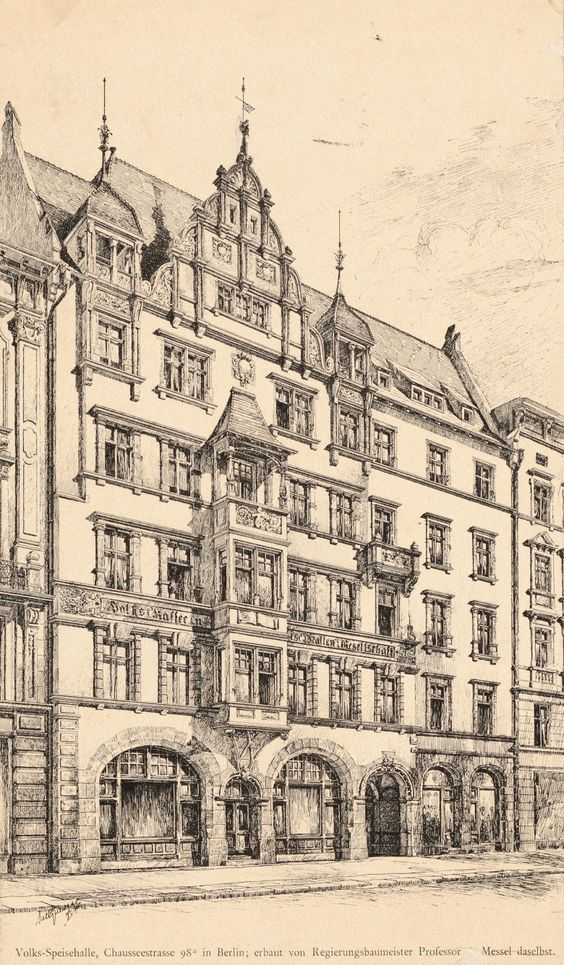
Messel's building Chausseestraße 105 (historically located at Chausseestraße 98 a), Berlin

- 1882–1883: Frenkel family grave in the Jewish Cemetery Berlin-Weißensee
- 1889: boiler house of the former English gas works in Berlin-Schöneberg
- 1889–1891: building housing a soup kitchen (Volkscafé- und Speisehallen-AG), Neue Schönhauser Straße, Berlin
- 1891–1893: Private residences on Kurfürstendamm (partially surviving)
- 1891–1892: Private residences and building housing "the people's cafe" (Volkscafé), Chausseestraße 98a (now Chausseestraße 105), Mitte, Berlin
- 1893–1895: social housing estate for the savings and housing cooperative, Berliner Spar- und Bauverein eGmbH, Berlin-Moabit, Sickingenstraße 7/8
- 1895–1897: courtyard of commercial enterprises on Alexandrinenstraße, Berlin-Kreuzberg
- 1897: Schönrade Manor in Neumark (Tuczno, Poland)
- 1897–1898: housing estate for the Berliner Spar- und Bauverein eGmbH, Berlin-Friedrichshain, Schreinerstraße 63/64 / Proskauer Straße 15–17 / Bänschstraße 26/28/30 (now modified)
- 1892–1906: Großherzoglich Hessisches Landesmuseum in Darmstadt, Zeughausstraße 1 (Friedensplatz 1)
- 1897–1898: Villa Wilhelm Wertheim, Berlin-Grunewald (together with Martin Altgeld, now modified)
- 1899–1900: administration building in Staßfurt-Leopoldshall (now the town hall)
- 1899–1900: housing estate for the Berliner Spar- und Bauverein eGmbH, Berlin-Prenzlauer Berg, Stargarder Straße 3/3a/4/5 / Greifenhagener Straße 56/57 (now modified)
- 1897–1900: bank building for the Berliner Handels-Gesellschaft, Berlin-Mitte, Behrenstraße 32/33 (including extensions up to 1908; see image at right)
- 1901–1902: building housing the Lette-Verein zur Förderung höherer Bildung und Erwerbstätigkeit des weiblichen Geschlechts, Berlin-Schöneberg, Viktoria- Luise-Platz 6
- 1901–1902: country house for the publisher Ferdinand Springer, Berlin-Wannsee
- 1901–1902: residence for Friedrich Back, Darmstadt, Jahnstraße 106 (considerably changed)
- 1903–1904: tomb of Louis Simon, Jewish Cemetery Schönhauser Allee, surviving in a damaged state
- 1903–1904: administrative building of the insurance company Landesversicherungsanstalt, Berlin, Am Köllnischen Park 2a/3 (restored ca. 1995)
- 1903–1906: Wertheim department store, Berlin, Rosenthaler Straße 27–31 / Sophienstraße 12–15 (partially surviving)
- 1904: tomb of the Rathenau family, Berlin-Oberschöneweide, in the Waldfriedhof
- 1905–1906: town hall, Ballenstedt (Harz)
- 1906: villa for Wolf Wertheim in Kladow bei Berlin
- 1907–1909: infant care clinic "Kaiserin-Auguste-Victoria-Haus", Berlin-Charlottenburg
- 1907–1908: villa for Franz Oppenheim, Berlin-Wannsee
- 1908: residence for Paul Ostermann von Roth, Darmstadt, Eugen-Bracht-Weg 6 (later use: Hessen Design e.V.)
- 1908: residence for Franz Wertheim, Berlin-Grunewald

== Literature (all in German) ==
- Maximilian Rapsilber: Alfred Messel. Berlin 1905.
- Fritz Stahl: Alfred Messel. Berlin 1911.
- Walter Curt Behrendt: Alfred Messel. Berlin 1911. (Reprint 1998)
- Robert Habel: Alfred Messels Wertheimbauten in Berlin. Der Beginn der modernen Architektur in Deutschland. Gebrüder Mann Verlag, Berlin 2009, ISBN 978-3-7861-2571-6.
- Carsten Lisecki: Urbane Handlungsspielräume. Universität der Künste Verlag, 2022, insbes. S. 50-54 Reformwohnungsbau, ISBN 978-3-89462-376-0
- Alfred Messel (1853–1909). Visionär der Großstadt (Eds.: Elke Blauert, Robert Habel und Hans-Dieter Nägelke together with Christiane Schmidt), Berlin 2009 (exhibition catalog of the Kunstbibliothek Staatliche Museen zu Berlin and the Architekturmuseum der Technischen Universität Berlin)
