= Jedynak =

- Polish: Budynek Domu Towarowego "Jedynak" w Bydgoszczy
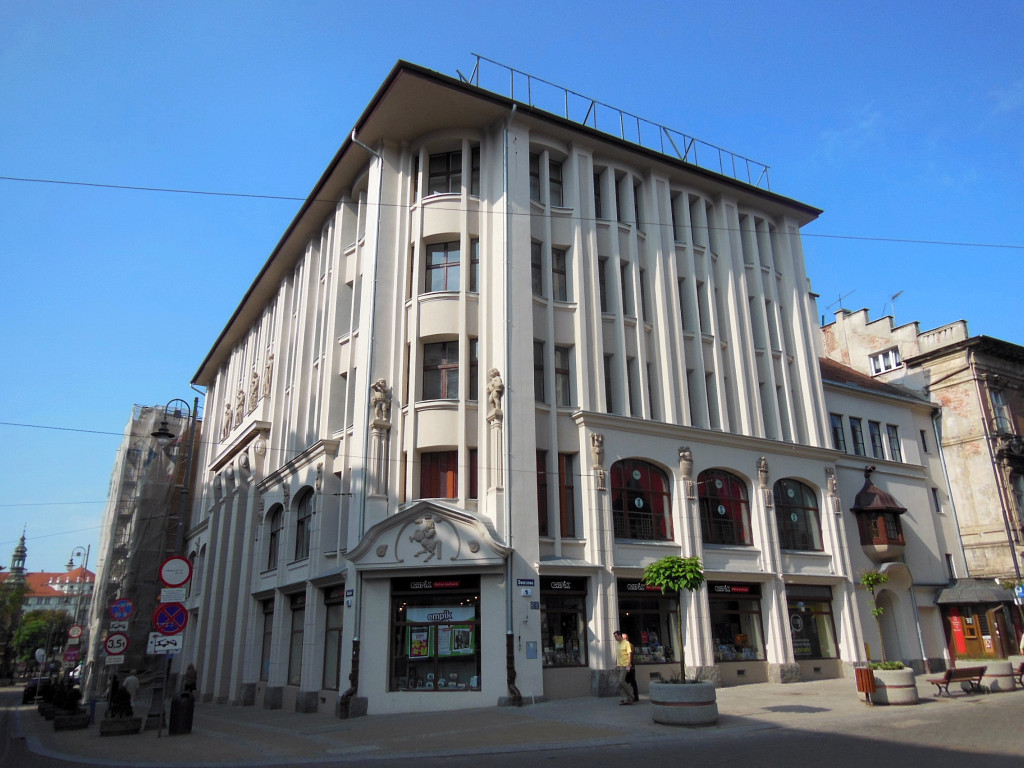
- Department Store "Jedynak" in Bydgoszcz
- Interactive map of the Jedynak area

General information
- Architectural style: Modern architecture
- Classification: Nr.601296-reg.87/A, 10 December 1971
- Location: Bydgoszcz, Poland, 15 Gdańsk Street, Bydgoszcz
- Coordinates: 53°7′3″N 18°0′10″E
- Opening: 1911
- Owner: Kaufhaus Conitzer & Söhne

Technical details
- Floor count: 5
- Floor area: 4519 m²

Design and construction
- Architect: Otto Walter

Website
- www.galeria-jedynak.pl

The Jedynak is a historical building Bydgoszcz, Poland. The building stands at 15 Gdańsk Street at the corner where the Gdańska and Dworcowa streets meet.

== History ==
Before the Jedynak was built, the site had been the location of a hotel run by the family Pawlikowski's since the second half of the 19th century. In 1909 the Conitzers, a wealthy Jewish family of merchants, bought the parcel of land where the Jedynak now stands. They then hired the Berlin architect Otto Walter, entrusting him with the task of turning the property into a department store.

The building was part of a network of department stores with more than 20 units throughout the Eastern German Empire (in particular Marienwerder, Malbork, Schwetz, Berlin, Coburg and Brandenburg). This chain operated under the name "Kaufhaus Conitzer & Söhne". The store in Bydgoszcz was one of few which was built from scratch.

=== Prussian period ===
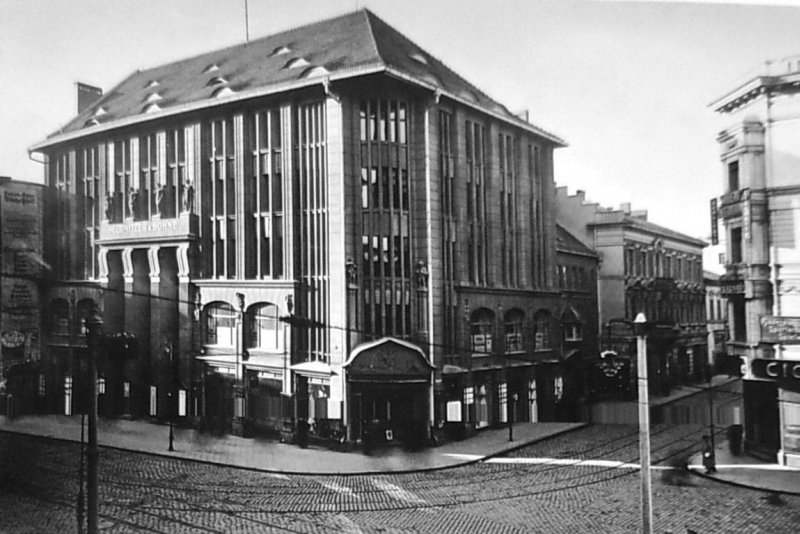
"Kaufhaus Conitzer & Söhne" in 1915

Otto Walter erected the building similar to the ones built at that time in Berlin, Stralsund and Paris. The design of "Kaufhaus Conitzer & Söhne" was inspired by contemporary department stores which were then thriving in Germany, in particular the "Wertheim" department stores established in the early 1900s in Berlin, Stralsund, and Breslau by Georg Wertheim and designed by the German architect Alfred Messel.

The "Kaufhaus Conitzer & Söhne", which opened on October 4, 1911, was the first department store in the West Prussian-Polish territory that introduced the concept of a new way of trading supported by large commercial buildings. Such department stores appeared in Germany in 1894, in the early 20th century in Berlin.

At its opening, "Kaufhaus Conitzer & Söhne" offered a wide and varied range of goods including: the ground floor: silk, linen & cotton articles, clothing, aprons, knitwear, wool, gloves, stockings, umbrellas, haberdashery, lace, linen goods and handicrafts; the first floor: wardrobe hats and shoes for men and boys; the second floor: garments for ladies and girls (dresses, blouses, skirts, dressing gowns, corsets and accessories), and furs; the third floor: carpets, curtains, fabrics, furniture, quilts, blankets, rugs, linoleum, leather, beds, mattresses; and the fourth floor: work rooms and studios consisting of dressmaking, underwears and décor.

=== Second Polish Republic / Interwar period ===
During Poland's interwar period, the department store was known as Be-De-Te for "Bydgoski Dom Towarowy" (English: Bydgoszcz Department Store). Bydgoszcz company's profits in 1938 ranked second among the largest department stores in Poland. "Be-De-Te" was then famous for its fashion shows. On the second floor there was a cafe.

=== World War II ===
Passing years changed the appearance of the building. A fire in 1945 kindled by Red Army soldiers destroyed many sections of the edifice: the building lost a sloping roof with round windows.

In 1947, the owner PSS Społem made the necessary repairs and modifications which allowed the building to house offices and warehouses.

=== Since 1949 ===
In 1949, the building was taken over by the state General Department Store, restoring its commercial function. In the 1960s, its name was changed to "Department Stores Center" (Polish: Dom Towarowy Centrum), and during the years 1978-1979 the building was refurbished.

The label Jedynak ("only child") stood on the roof of the building for around 40 years, before it was removed in 2000. In 2009, the new owner of the building, Centrum Development and Investments from Warsaw, developed a plan to modernize and restore the facility to revive the commercial activity, in close coordination with conservators.

In 2012, a facade renovation was performed, which re-exposed statues and reliefs which were originally part of the decor.

== Architecture ==
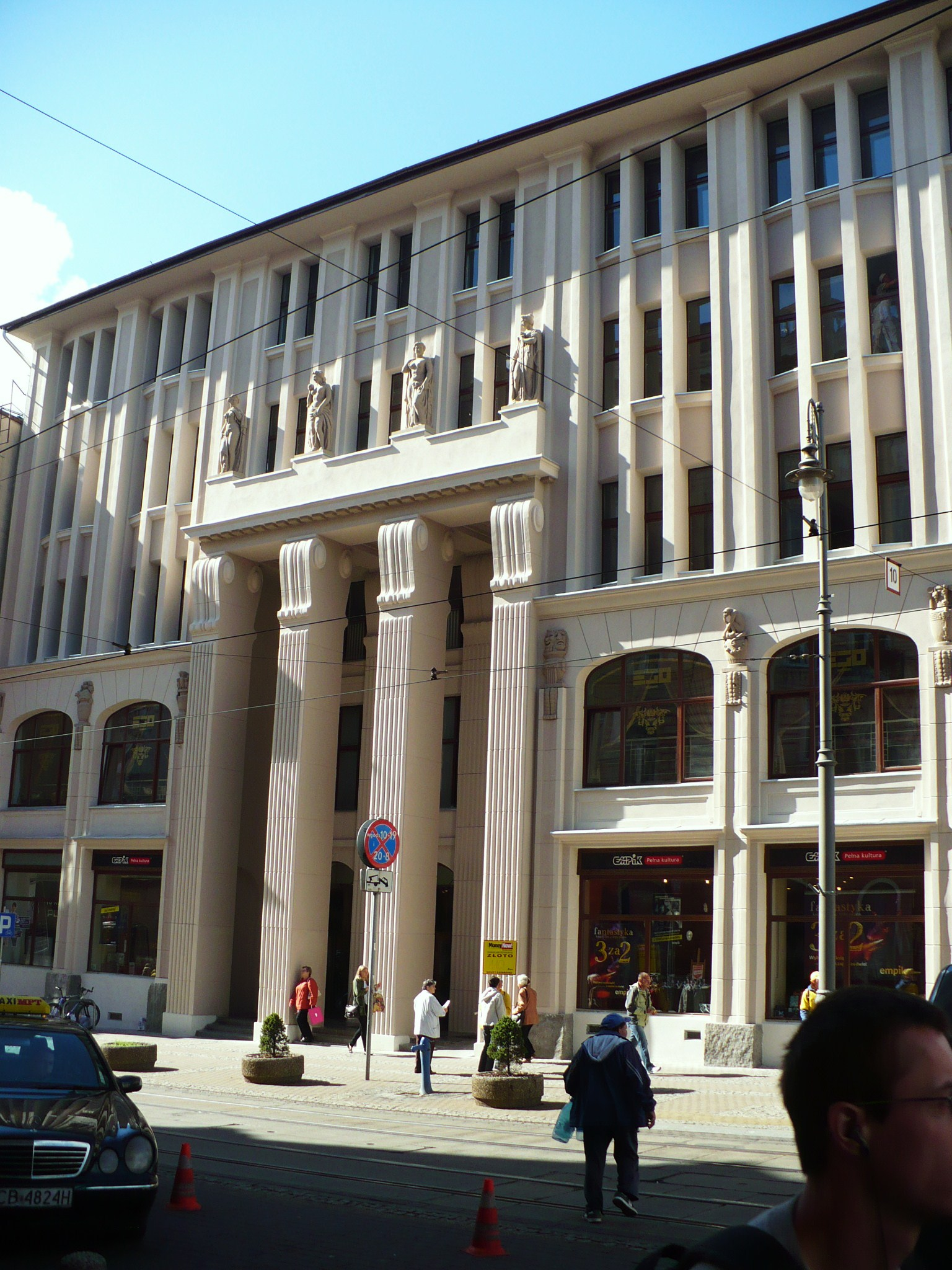
View of main facade from Gdańsk Street

The building was erected in modernist style, alluding to the style of department stores constructed in the German Empire or Paris. At this time in Bydgoszcz, the "Kaufhaus Conitzer & Söhne" building pioneered the use of reinforced concrete in a modern design. The facade, rhythmically fragmented with pilaster strips, has a majestic entrance onto Gdańsk Street: it is topped by an ostentatious portico with a pediment surmounted by sculptures inspired by the art of antiquity and depicting allegorical female figures: including Aphrodite - the goddess of beauty and love; Eris - the goddess of discord; Hera - the mother of the gods; and Athena - the goddess of wisdom and war. Intriguing decorative motives stand on the main facade include: a Greek amphora with dangling vine shoots and vases; theatrical masks (tragic and comic); and animal figures (a sleeping cat, a sitting monkey, an owl protecting its two cubs).

The angled corner is decorated with a number of references to Dionysus. On the pediment of the ground floor window, the image of Silenus can be found, and above, on each of the slender columns stand 2 sculptures: a boy playing the flute, with winegrapes hanging on the hips; and a child holding basket of fruit with a bird under his arm.

=== Interiors ===
The building has a large atrium covered with a glass roof. The ceilings are supported by columns and the four levels are giving onto the atrium, receiving directly natural light.

Travel between stories from the ground floor to the fourth floor is made by elevator and stairs, which are smartly separated in 3 different stairways. The interior department store displays simplicity and functionality. The absence of stucco decoration gave to the interior grace and elegance.

The building was registered on the Pomeranian Heritage List (Nr.601296-reg.87/A) on 10 December 1971.

== Gallery ==
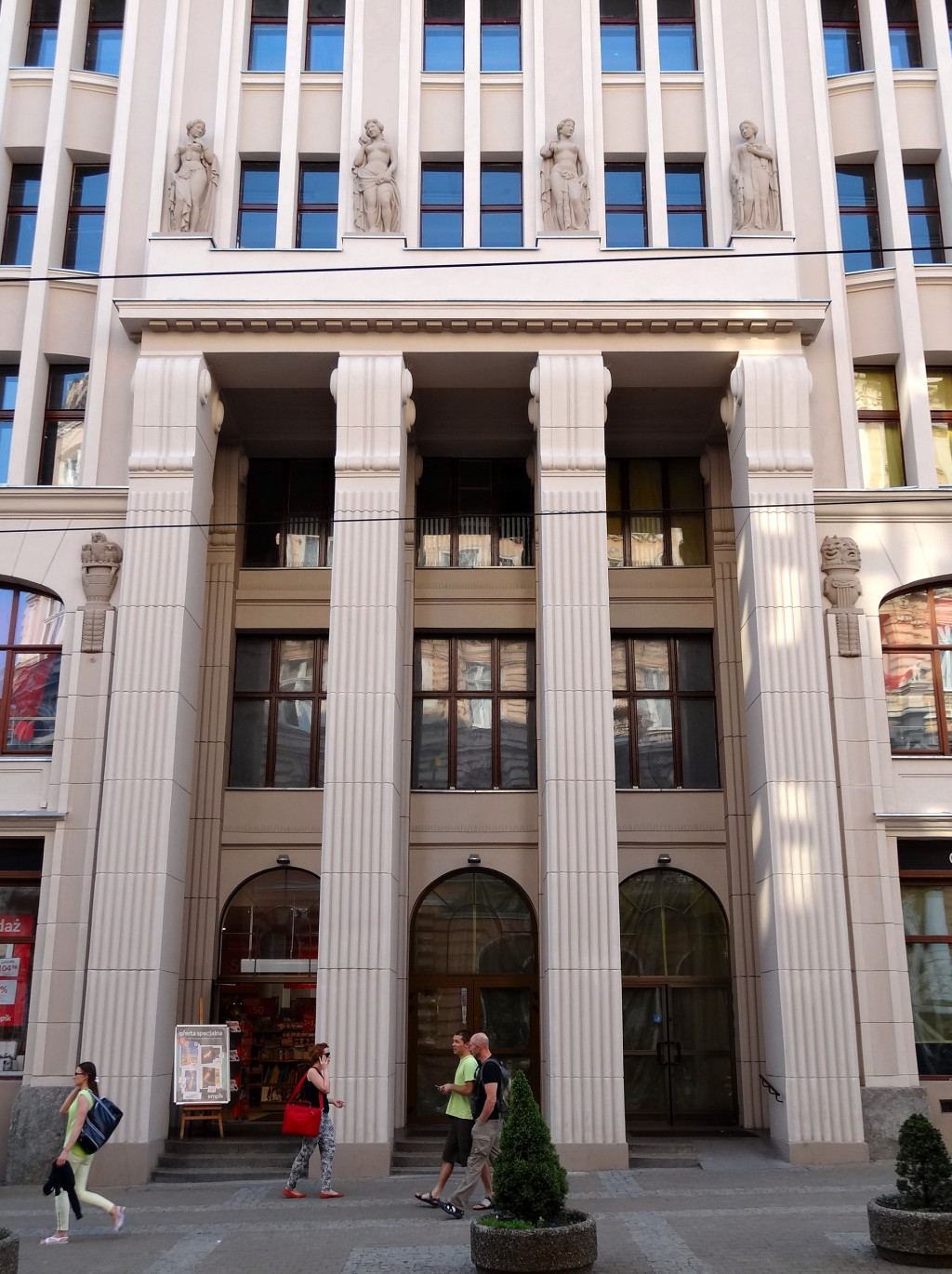
Portico topped with Greek goddesses

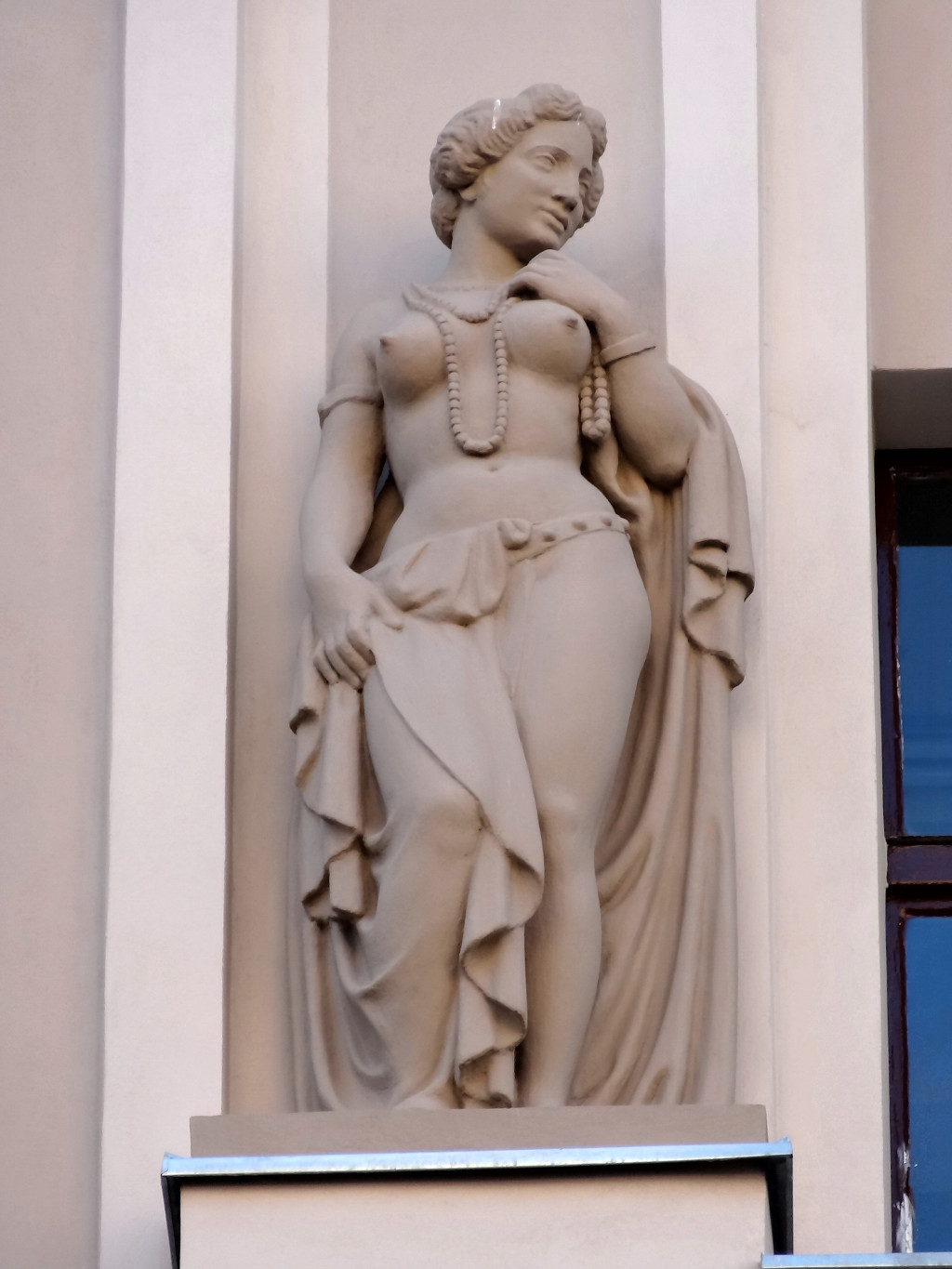
Aphrodite

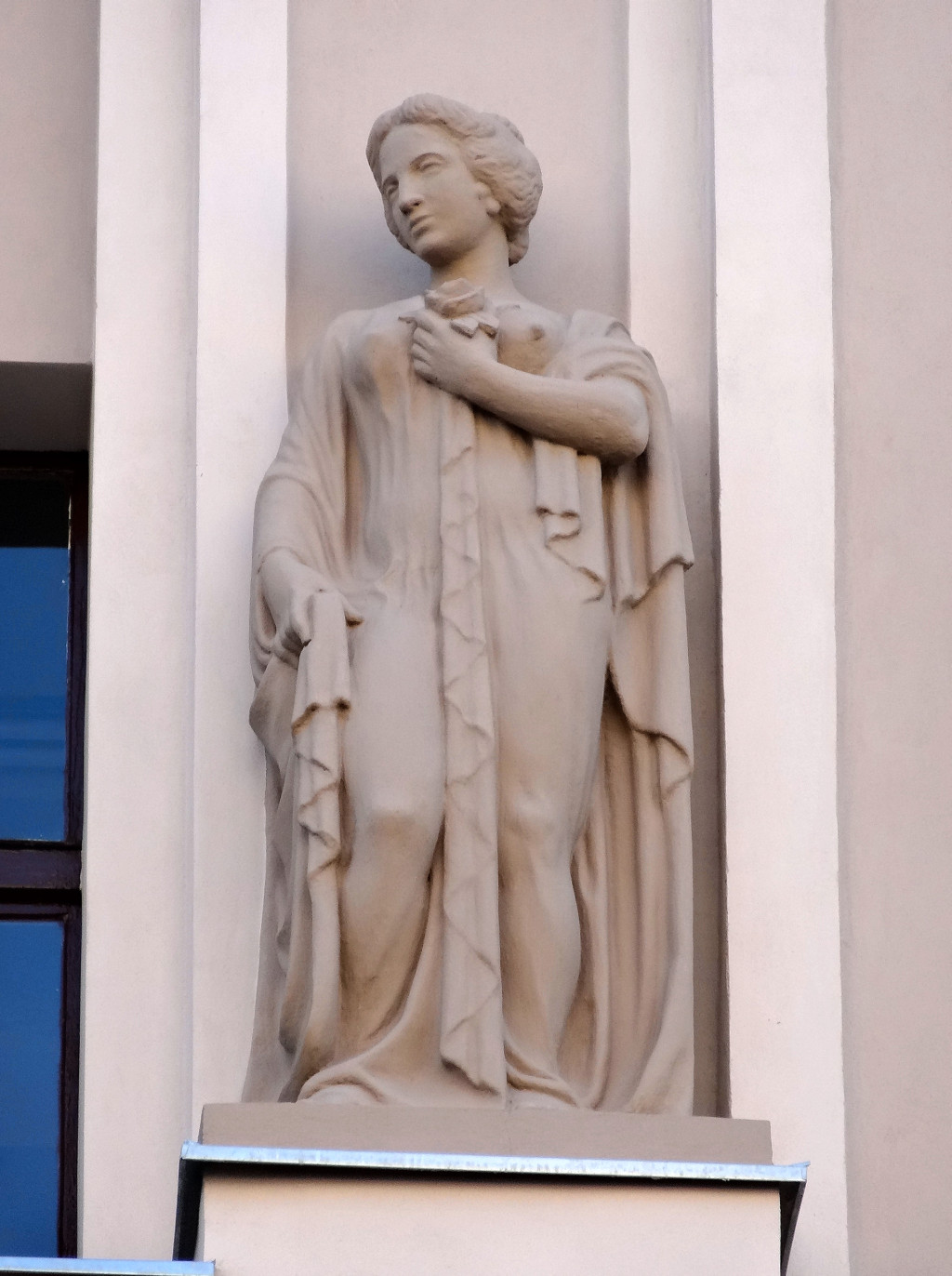
Athena

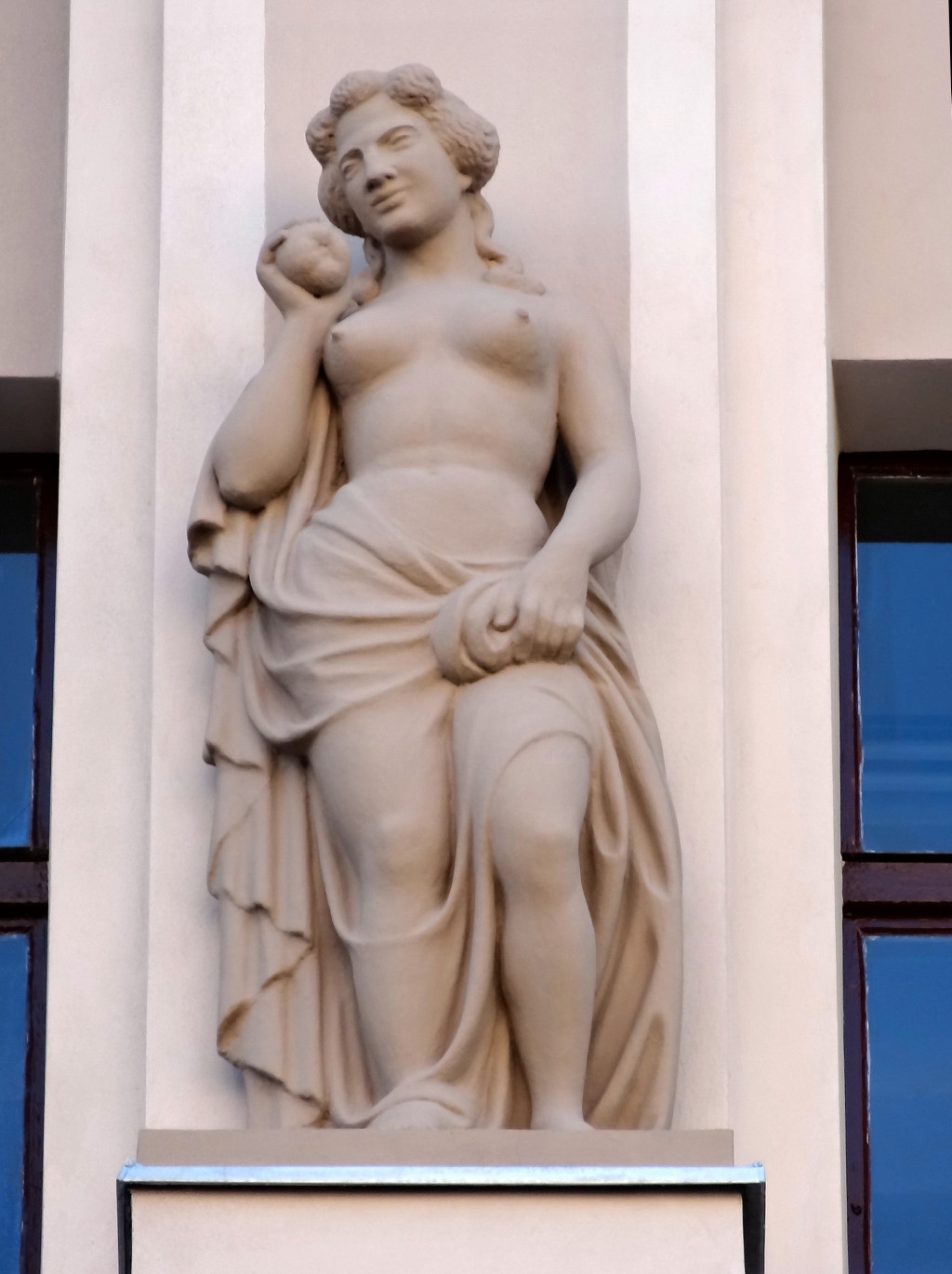
Eris

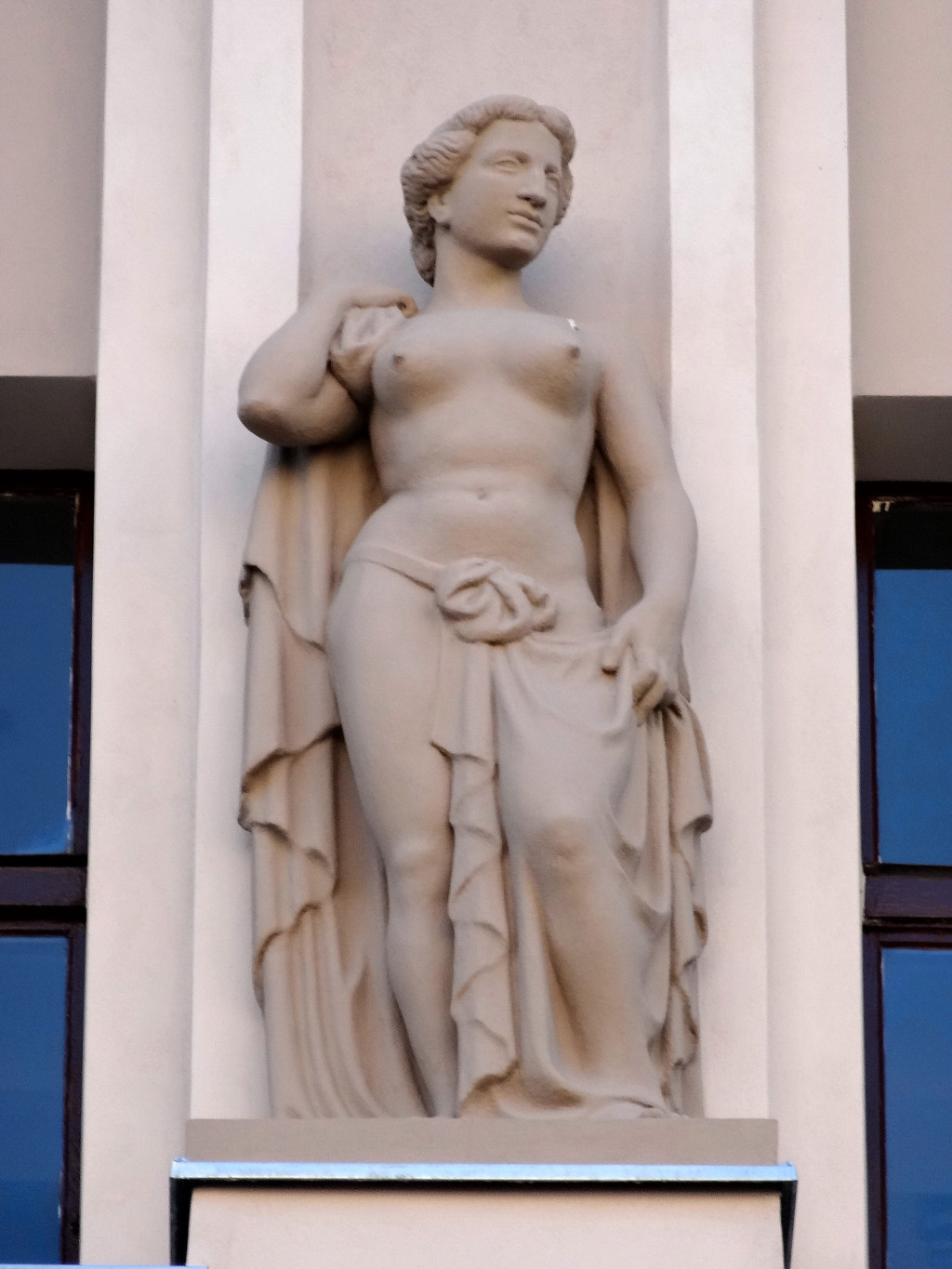
Hera

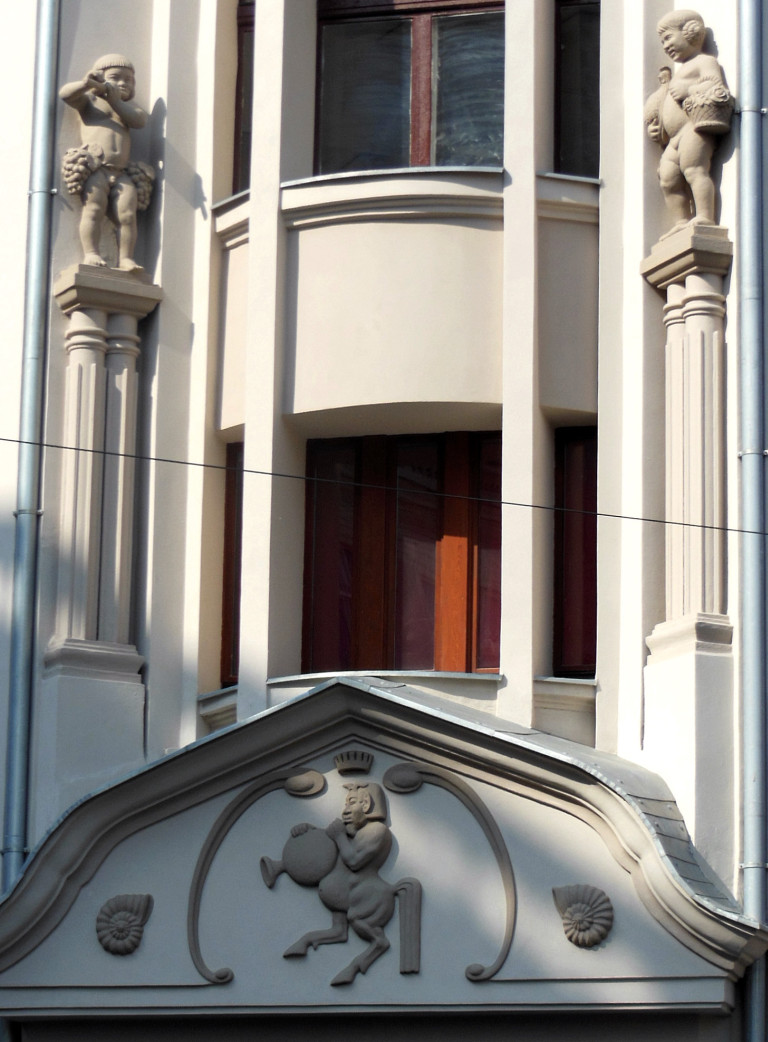
Representations on facade's corner

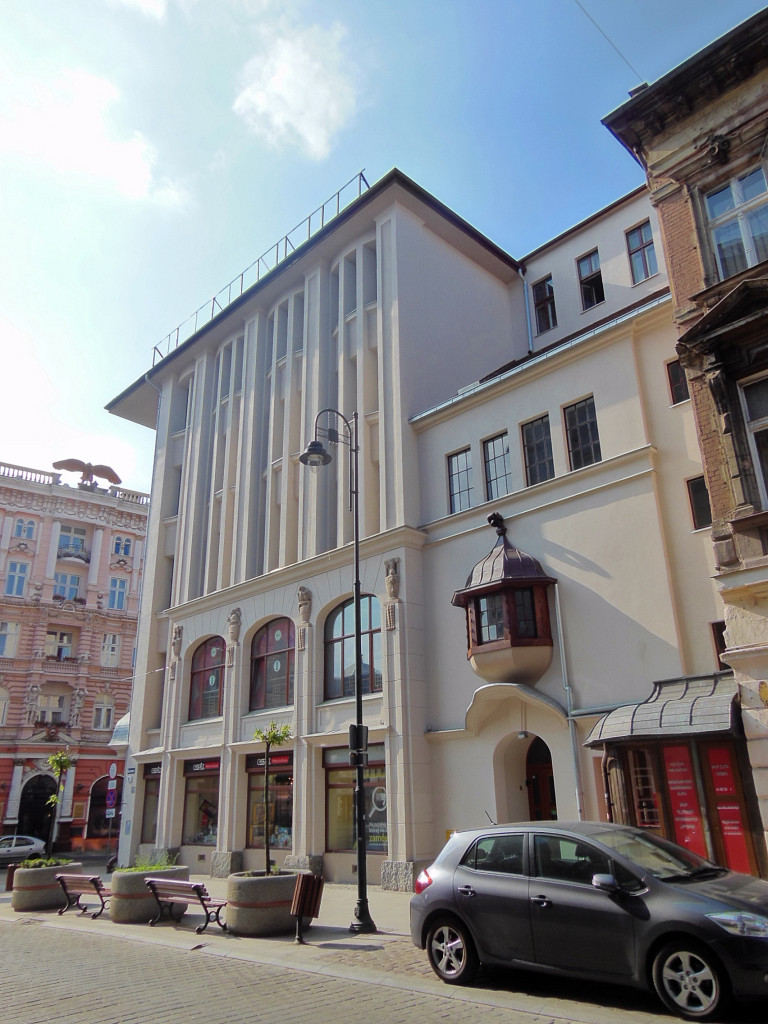
View of facade on Dworcowa street

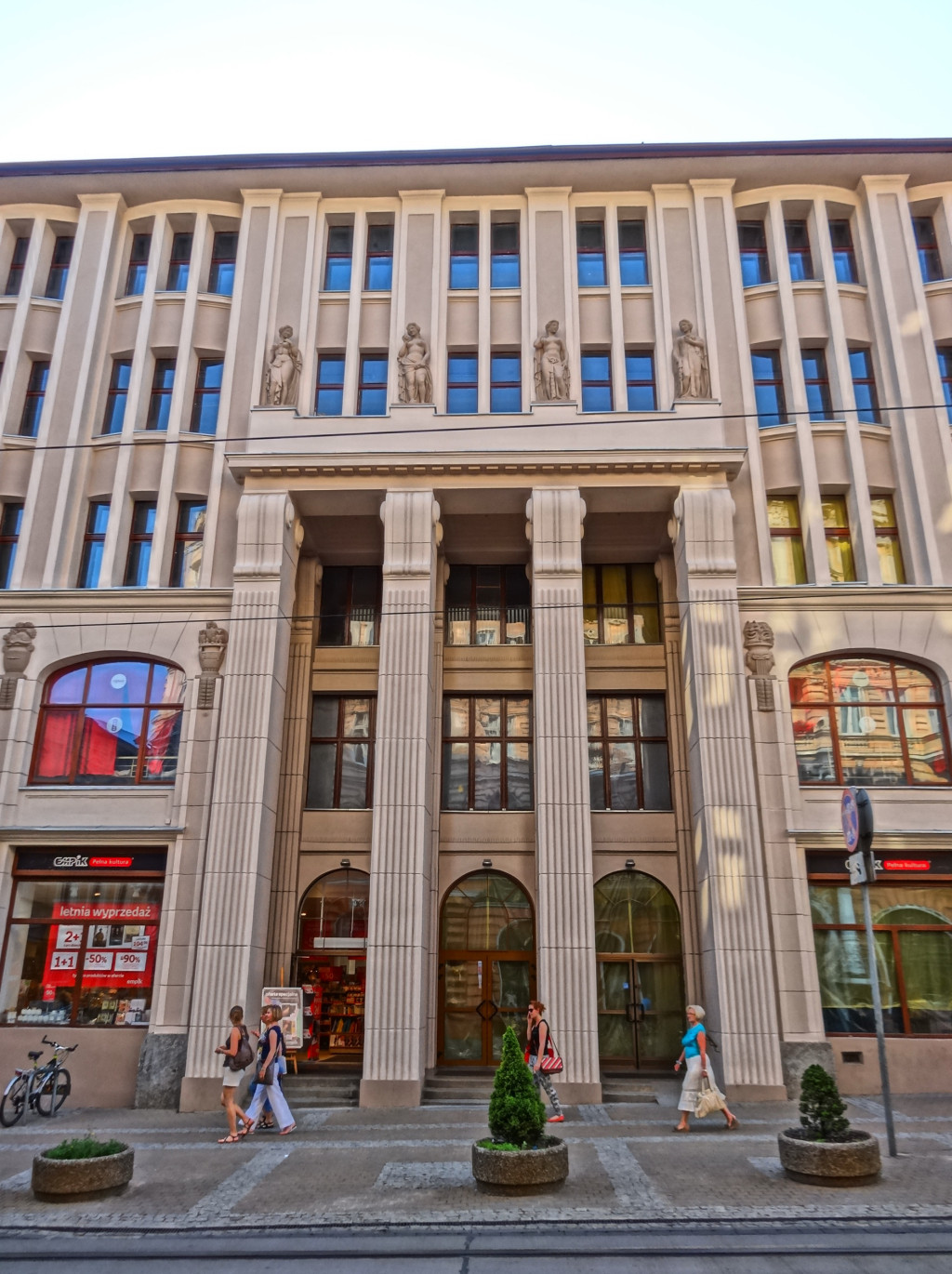
Facade onto Gdańsk Street

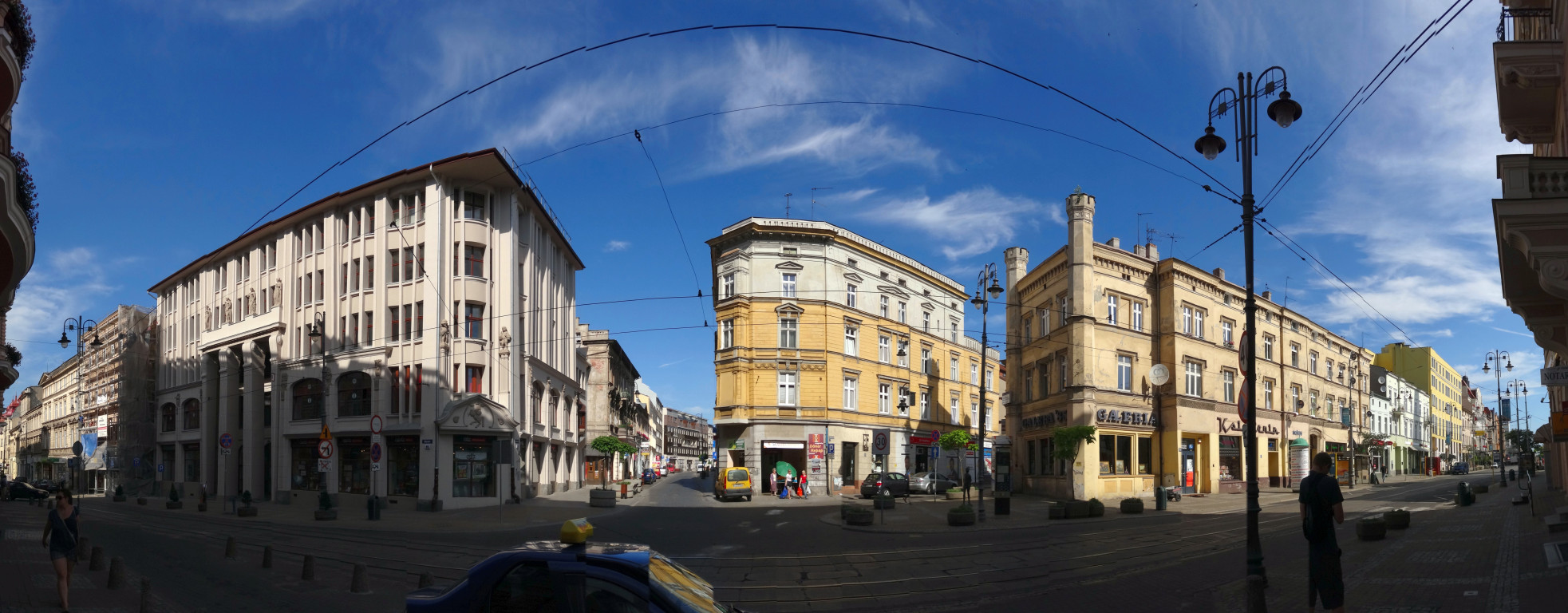
Panorama with Alexander Timm House (right) and Department Store "Jedynak" (left)
