= Ratner =

Ratner may refer to:

- Ratner's, a Jewish restaurant in New York City
- the Ratner Group, a specialty retail jeweler, now Signet Jewelers

Persons with the surname Ratner:

- A. Mark Ratner (born 1948), American game designer
- Ann Rachel Ratner (later Miller, 1921–2006), American sociologist and demographer
- Bill Ratner (born 1947), American voice actor
- Brett Ratner (born 1969), American filmmaker and music video director
- Bruce Ratner (born 1945), American real estate developer
- Carl Ratner (born 1943), American psychologist
- Ellen Ratner, American radio talk show host, news analyst on Fox News
- Gerald Ratner (born 1949), British businessman, former chief executive of the Ratner Group
- Hank J. Ratner (born 1959), American media, sports, entertainment and telecommunications executive
- Iosif Ratner (1901–1953), Soviet general
- Leonard G. Ratner (1916–2011), American musicologist
- Marina Ratner (1938–2017), American mathematician
- Marc Ratner, American entrepreneur
- Mark Ratner (1942–2026), American physical chemist and academic
- Max Ratner (1907-1995), American real estate developer
- Michael Ratner (1943–2016), American attorney and human rights activist
- Pamela Anne Ratner (born 1955), Canadian nurse-scientist and academic leader
- Payne Ratner (1896–1974), American politician, 28th Governor of Kansas

== See also ==
- Gerald Ratner Athletics Center
- Ratner's Star, a novel by Don DeLillo
- Ratner's theorems in ergodic theory proved by Marina Ratner
- Rattner
