= Rattner =

Rattner is a surname. Notable people with the surname include:

- Abraham Rattner (1895–1978), American artist
- Brett Rattner (born 1969), American film director and producer
- Justin Rattner, American businessman and retired Intel Senior Fellow, Corporate Vice President and former director of Intel Labs
- Steven Rattner (born 1952), American investment manager
- Steven C. Rattner (born 1960), American Managing Director of Credit Suisse

== See also ==
- Leepa-Rattner Museum of Art
- Ratner (disambiguation)
