= Bertha von Arnswaldt =

Berlin salonière

Baroness Bertha von Arnswaldt (February 3, 1850 in London – 12 July 1919 in Berlin), born Bertha Holland, was a Berlin salonière.

Her husband was Hermann von Arnswaldt (1841–1910), a member of the Reichstag. He was part of the Arnswald family - which included August von Arnswald who was a friend of the poet Annette von Droste-Hülshoff, or Bernhard von Arnswald, who was a Commanding officer of Castle Wartburg.

Before this she married Karl Louis Andreae (1839–1878), together they had a son named Fritz Andreae, who married Edith Rathenau.

Many habitués visited her house at Nollendorfplatz 7th, and it was considered the most important Berliner Salon in the years immediately before the outbreak of world war in 1914.

The specialty was in the unfamiliar social diversity of its audience: Guests of hers ranged from wealthy businessmen, to members of the nobility, as well as writers of early modernism.
