= Alexander Timm House =

- Polish: Kamienica Aleksandra Timma w Bydgoszczy
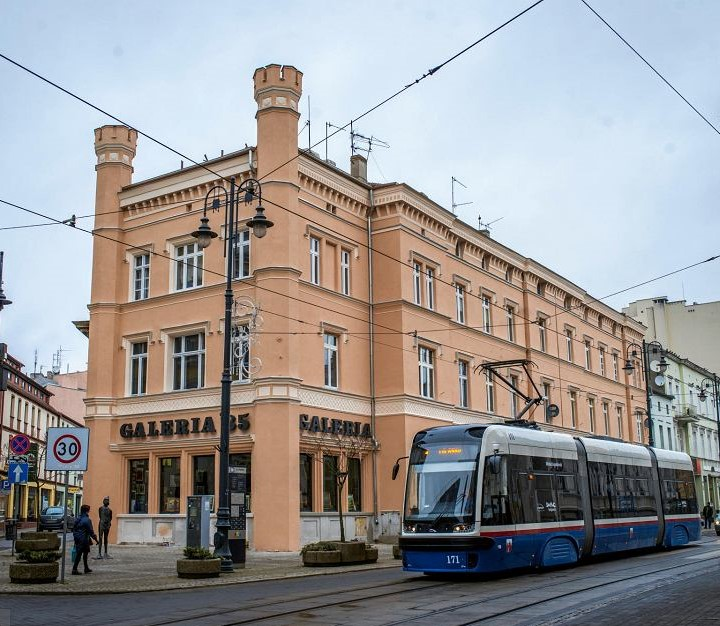
- Alexander Timm House in Bydgoszcz, view from Gdańska street

General information
- Type: Tenement
- Architectural style: Eclecticism, Neoclassicism
- Location: 17 Gdańska street, Bydgoszcz, Poland, Poland
- Coordinates: 53°07′35″N 18°0′12″E
- Inaugurated: 1852 & 1910 (renovation)
- Client: Aleksander Timm

Technical details
- Floor count: 3

Design and construction
- Architects: B. Brinkmann, O.F.W. Muller

Alexander Timm House is a tenement located in Bydgoszcz, Poland, at 17 Gdańska street.

== Location ==
The building stands at the intersection of Gdańska and Pomorska streets.

== History ==
The house has been built at the initiative of rentier Alexander William Timm in 1852.

It was designed by architect B. Brinkmann. Once erected, it was one of the largest tenement houses in the city of Bromberg.

The building has been rebuilt in 1910, as commissioned by the city councillor Carl Beck, and designed by O. M. W. Muller.

On the wall near the entrance on Gdańska street 17, a commemorative plaque has been placed in honor of Stanisław Brzęczkowski (1897–1955), an artist and educator, who worked at the printing house at 1 Jagiellońska Street.

At the end of 2017, a deep restoration of the building has taken place, underlining the different architectural details.

== Architecture ==
Tenement presents architectural forms of historism, with touches of medieval architecture revival.

The southern facade elevation is flanked by octagonal slender towers, topped with battlements. On preserved iconography, one can notice facades painted in red, as for a brick defense wall, putting the finishing touch to the medieval setting. It is the area's oldest two-storey tenement house.

== Gallery ==
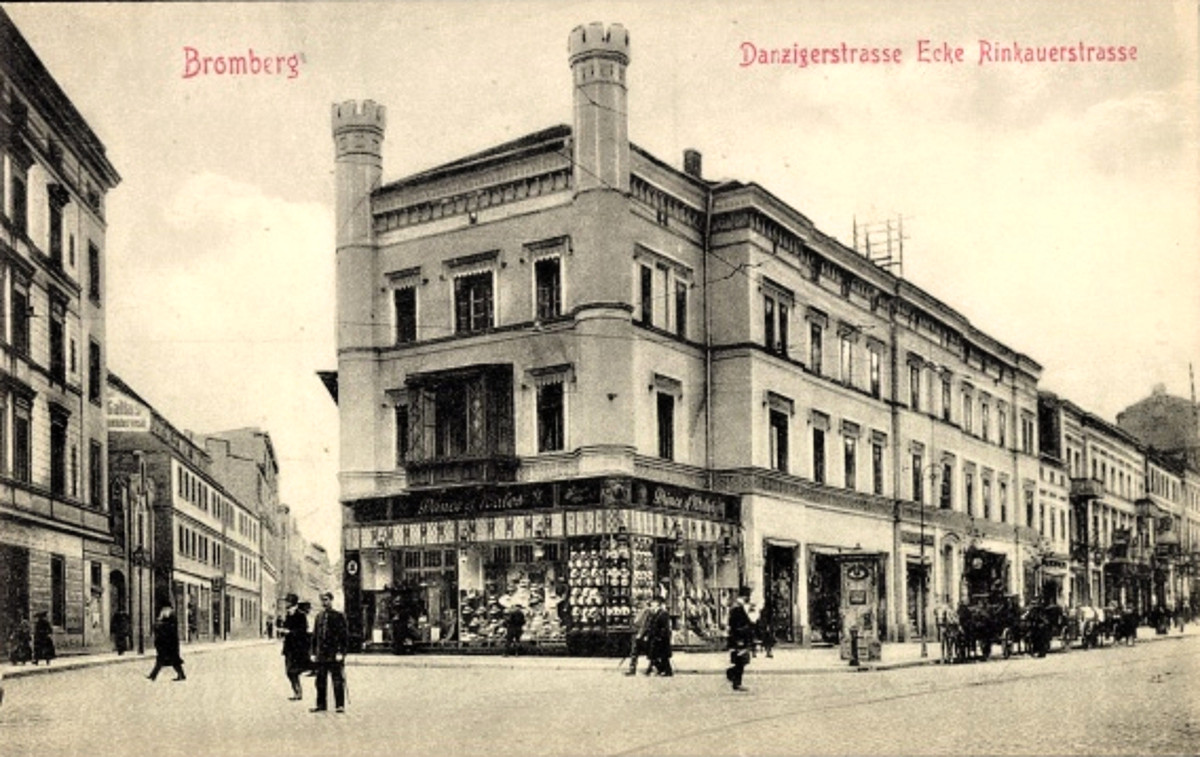
The tenement ca 1916

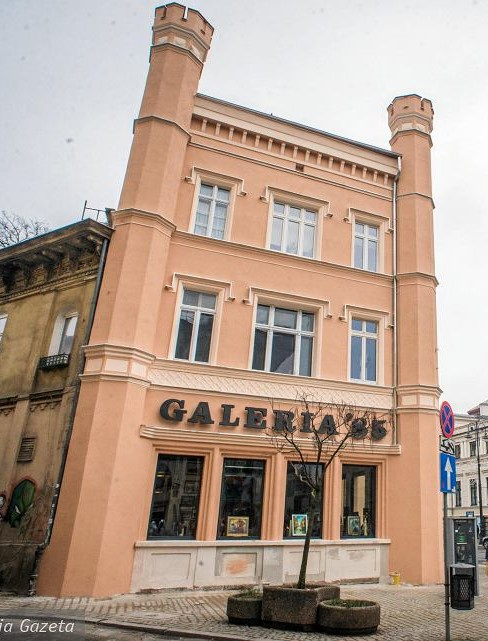
Southern facade of the building

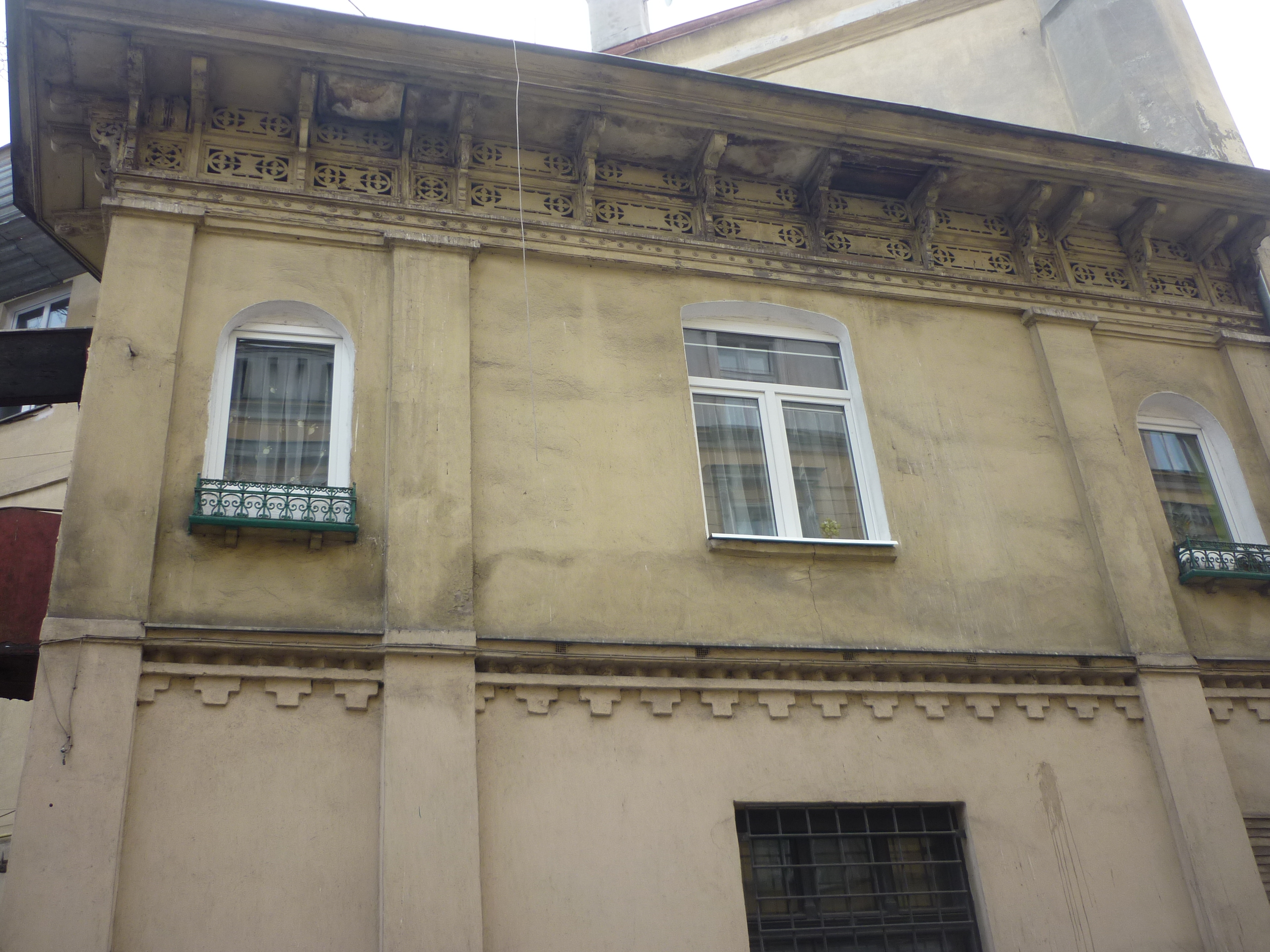
Facade onto Pomorska Street

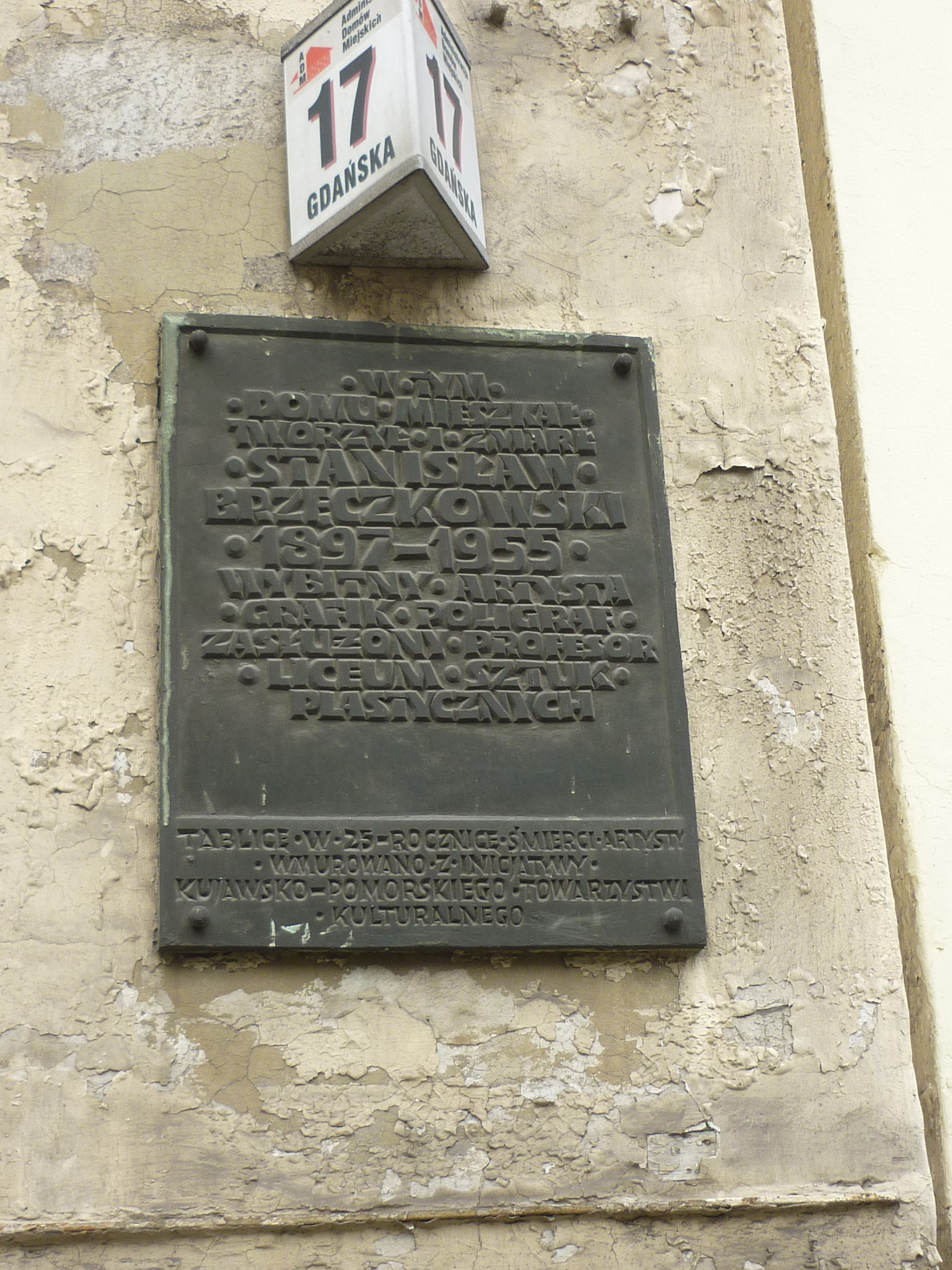
Plaque in memory of Stanisław Brzęczkowski

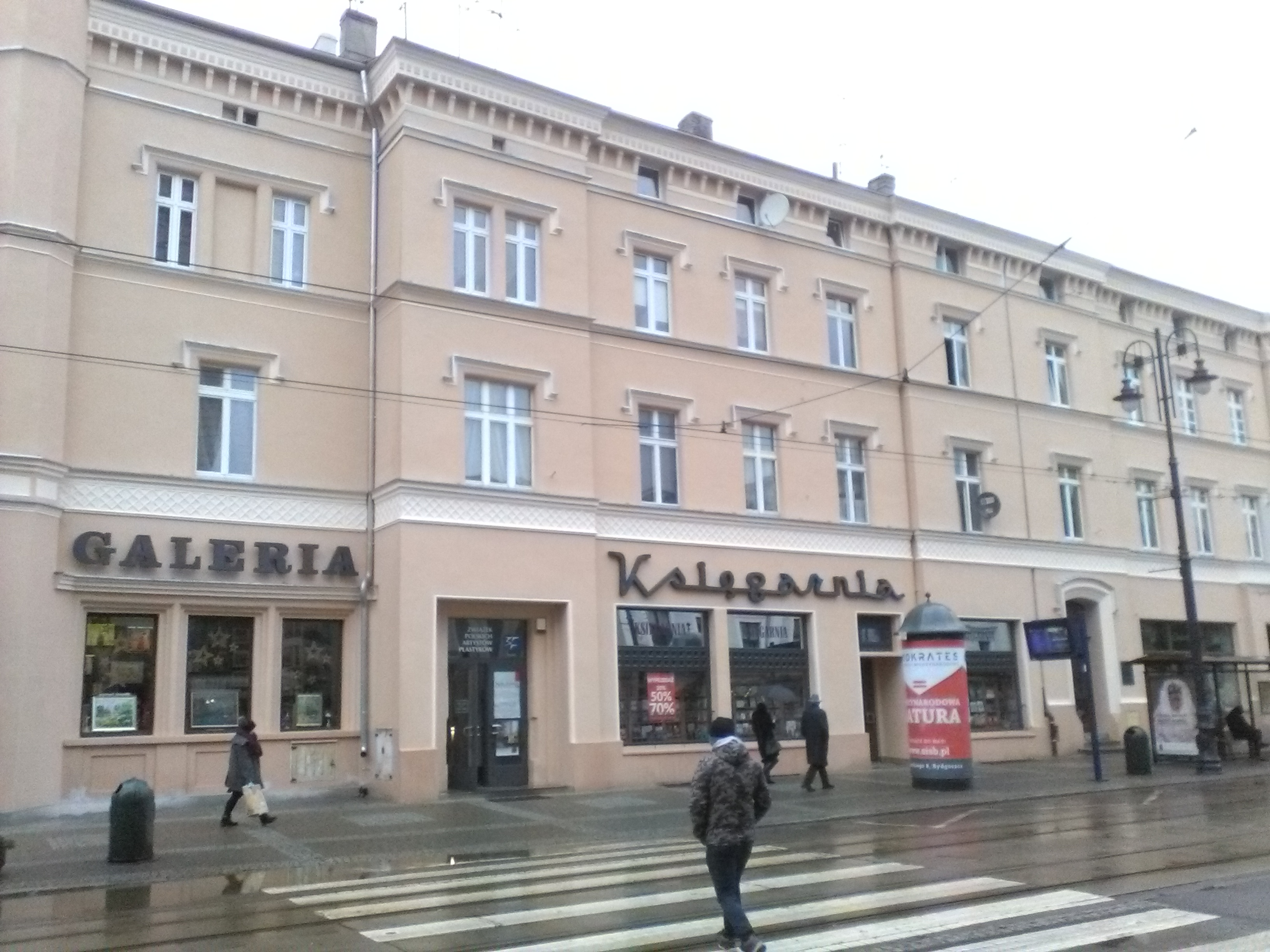
Facade on Gdańska street after restoration

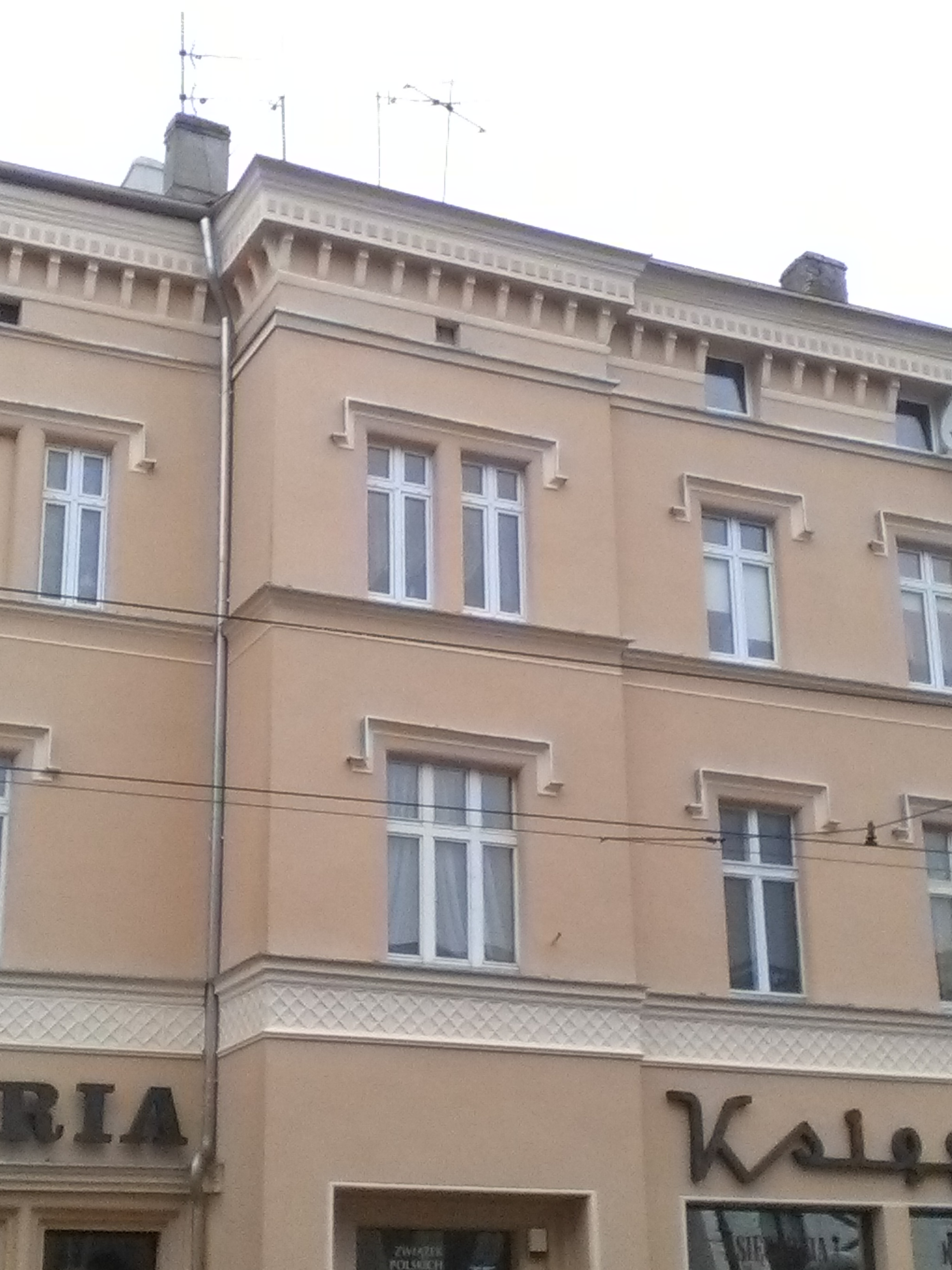
Details of the facade
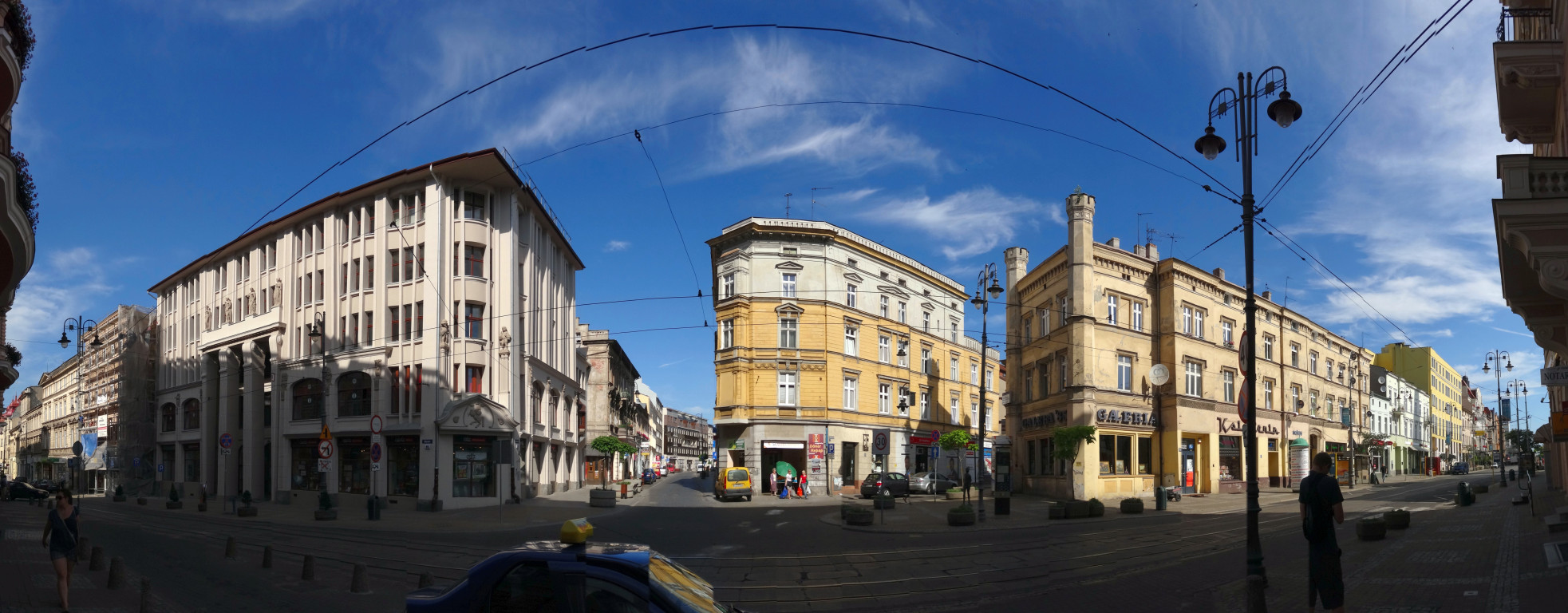
Panorama with Alexander Timm House (right) and Department Store "Jedynak" (left)

== See also ==
- Bydgoszcz
- Dworcowa Street in Bydgoszcz
- Gdanska Street in Bydgoszcz
- Pomorska Street in Bydgoszcz

== Bibliography ==
- (in Polish) Bręczewska-Kulesza Daria, Derkowska-Kostkowska Bogna, Wysocka A. (2003). Ulica Gdańska. Przewodnik historyczny. Bydgoszcz: Wojewódzki Ośrodek Kultury w Bydgoszczy. ISBN 9788386970100.
