= Edith Andreae =

Edith Andreae, born Rathenau (18 January 1883–1952) was a German salonière. She was a literary executor and editor of the works of her brother Walther Rathenau.

Edith Rathenau was born in 1883 in Berlin, only daughter of German-Jewish industrialist Emil Rathenau and his wife Mathilde Rathenau (born Nachmann), who belonged to a family descended from the rabbi Moses ben Nachmann - a mystic of the 12th century.

She was the younger sister of politician Walther Rathenau and the industrialist Erich Rathenau. On 10 February 1902, she married banker Fritz Andreae, the son of the salonière Bertha von Arnswaldt and Karl Louis Andreae (1839–1878), whose family were descended from both Protestant theologian Jakob Andreae and his grandson, the Rosicrucian, Johann Valentin Andreae.

In her youth Edith Andreae was a friend of Katia Mann.

In 1913 the family moved into the Villa Andreae in Grunewald. Edith Andreae there showed an "ambitious high degree of sociability". She was known as "the most intellectual woman in Berlin", and she supported Max Reinhardt and numerous intellectuals of her time, including Hugo von Hofmannsthal, Gerhart Hauptmann, Ursula Herking and Thomas Mann. Also such politicians as Friedrich Ebert were guests in her house.

After the death of her brother Walther Rathenau she was the owner of Castle Freienwalde. The castle became a memorial for Rathenau as a part of the Walther-Rathenau-Foundation, which was dissolved in 1939.

During the Nazi era the family had to give up the house in the Grunewald in 1938 and emigrated to Switzerland in 1939. The family settled in Zurich. There Fritz Andreae died in 1950 and Edith Andreae two years later in 1952.
