= Jenny Apolant =

German Jewish feminist and women's suffrage activist

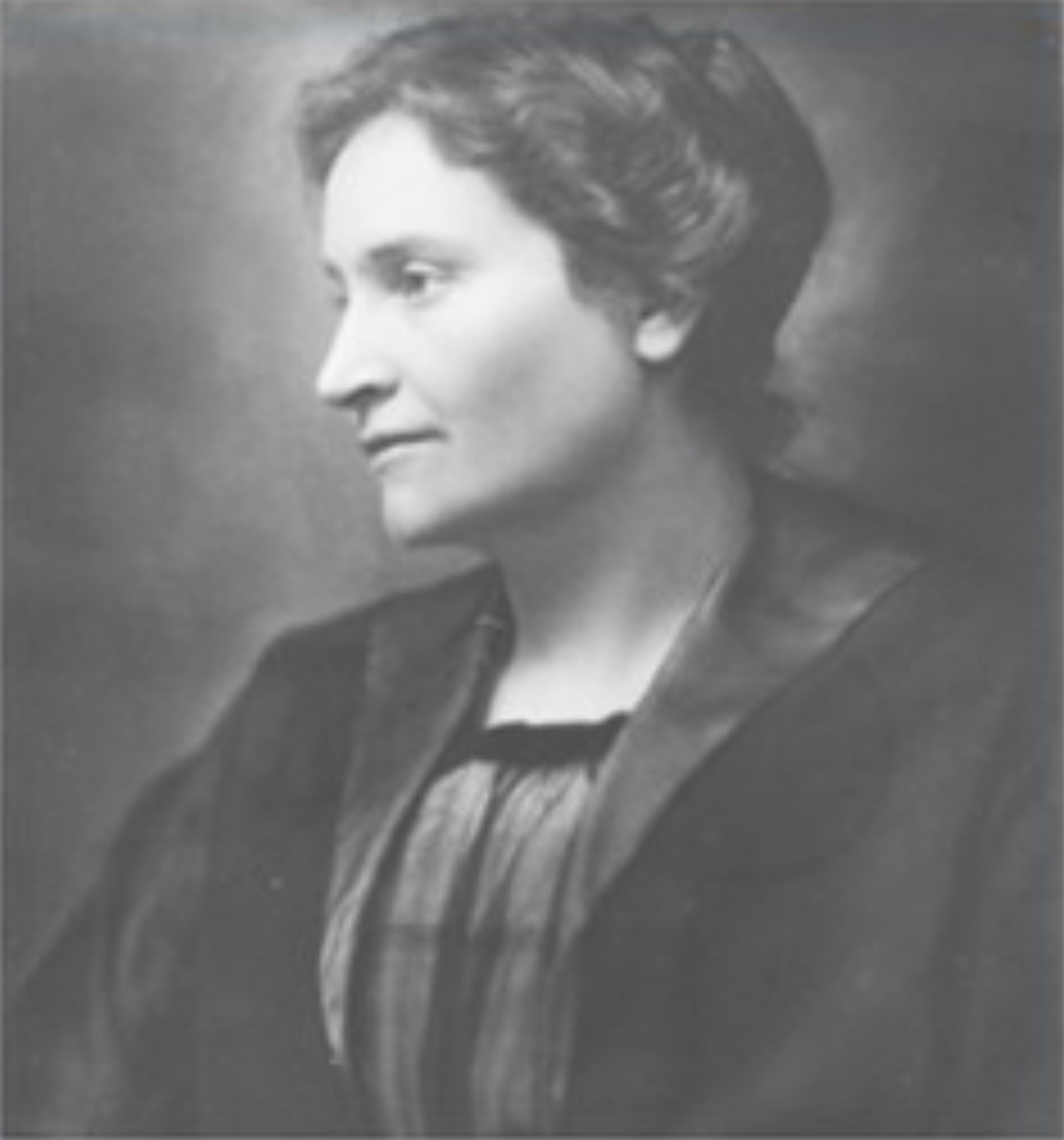
- Born: 5 November 1874; Berlin, Germany
- Died: 5 June 1925 (aged 50); Frankfurt
- Spouse: Hugo Apolant
- Parent(s): Mathilde and Emil Rathenau
- Relatives: Walther Rathenau and Josephine Levy-Rathenau

Jenny Apolant (1874–1925) was a German Jewish feminist and women's suffrage activist. Apolant played a key role in the early movement for women's rights in Germany.

In 1907, Apolant established the Information Center for Women's Community Services, a project of the General German Women's Association (Allgemeinen Deutschen Frauenverein). During her time in the organization, she authored numerous writings on the role of women in German society. She was a member of the Central Association of German Citizens of Jewish Faith.

From 1919 to 1924, Apolant served as a DDP municipal councillor in Frankfurt, making her one of the first women to hold such position. In 1922, she founded the Political Workers Association (Politische Arbeitsgemeinschaft) which provided women with political education and prepared them to hold public office.

== Biography ==
Jenny Rathenau was born on 5 November 1874 in Berlin, Germany, to Mathilde Rathenau (née Nachman) and industrialist Emil Rathenau. She attended Humboldt Academy (Humboldtakademie) from 1891 to 1895, where she received lectures on art history and music. In 1899, Apolant married doctor and experimental cancer researcher, Hugo Apolant (1866–1915); their daughter Sophie Ella was born in January 1900. The family moved to Frankfurt in 1905 for Hugo's job. While in Frankfurt, she founded temperance restaurants and worked in connection with hospitals.

Her husband Hugo Apolant died in 1915. Jenny Apolant suffered from financial and health problems in her later years. She was forced to stay in sanatoriums after several breakdowns, yet kept a positive spirit. Apolant died on 5 June 1925 of a heart condition. After Jenny's death, in the face of adversity from the Nazis, the Jewish Women's League recalled her as one person who was "inseparable from the story of the German women's movement." She was remembered fondly by Rabbi Georg Salzberger in his memoir.
