= Emil Rathenau =

German businessman

- Dr. Emil M. Rathenau, 1883
- Born: 11 December 1838; Berlin, Kingdom of Prussia, German Confederation
- Died: 20 June 1915 (aged 76)
- Occupation: Entrepreneur
- Spouse: Mathilde Nachmann
- Children: Walther Rathenau; Erich Rathenau; Jenny Apolant
- Parent: Moritz Rathenau

Emil Moritz Rathenau (11 December 1838 – 20 June 1915) was a German entrepreneur, industrialist, mechanical engineer. He was a leading figure in the early European electrical industry and founder of AEG.

== Early life ==
Rathenau was born in Berlin, into a wealthy Jewish merchant family based on Viktoriastrasse by the Tiergarten, an old Jewish quarter of the city. His father Moritz Rathenau, was a grain trader who had moved to Berlin to set up business. His mother, Therese, was the daughter of Josef Liebermann, another businessman attracted to the growing opportunities of the burgeoning Prussian capital. Emil was particularly close to his mother, whom he regularly visited until her death in 1894. His parents families had met through the Gesellschaft der Freunde (Society of Friends), a cultural organisation played a central role amongst the prominent members Jewish community in Berlin.

Emil undertook an apprenticeship in Silesia, working for a company owned by the Liebermann family. After four and half unhappy years he received a large inheritance following the death of his grandfather, Josef Liebermann. This enabled him to gain a technical training in Hanover and Zurich, and then an appointment as a technical adviser for Borsig, a Berlin-based manufacturer for the railway sector. However he did not remain there long, and spent some time in England expanding his experience. Upon his return to Berlin, in 1866 he married Mathilde Nachmann, daughter of the Frankfurt banker Isaak Nachmann (1816–1870). Also in 1865 he joined an old school friend in taking over a small machine building factory in Berlin.

== Business career ==
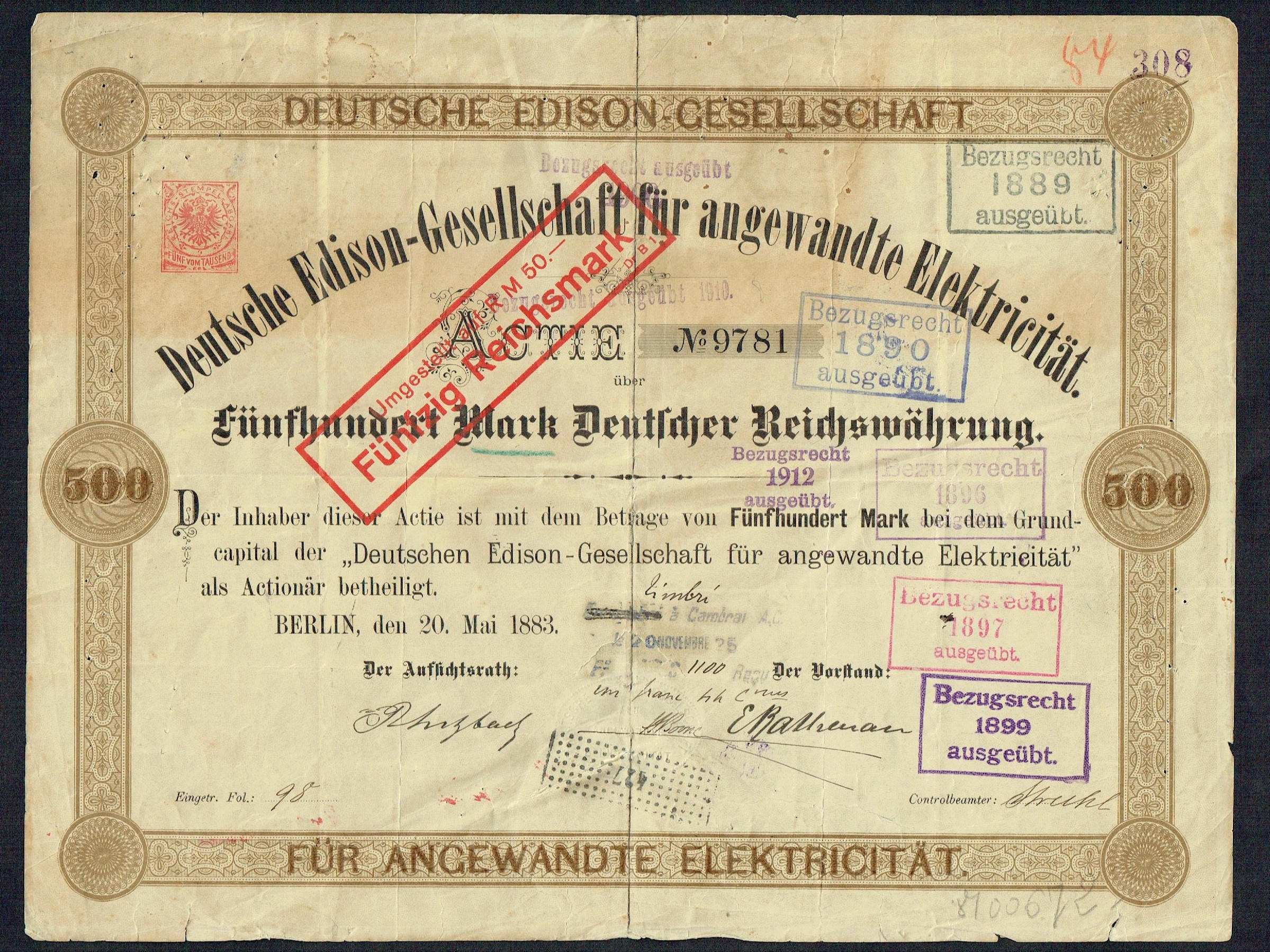
Share of the Deutsche Edison-Gesellschaft für angewandte Elektricität, issued 20 may 1883, signed by its founder Emil Rathenau

In 1865, Rathenau was a partner in a factory, during which time (while traveling abroad) he recognized the possibilities of the then newly emerging electrical technology. The dramatic victory over France in the Franco-Prussian War was ensued by a collapse, prompting Rathenau to sell up in 1873.

A Grand Tour of Central and Eastern Europe took him to Vienna Science Exhibition, Philadelphia, and Paris. In 1881, he attended the International Exposition of Electricity, Paris and saw Thomas Alva Edison's invention of the light bulb for the first time. Realizing the potential of electricity, he acquired the rights to manufacture products based on Edison's patents with the help of a bank group. By 1907 AEG had become the largest commercial company in the world. The bank advised him to partner with his competitor Werner von Siemens. Since both were followers of the idea of monopoly they signed a contract of trust (monopoly) where Siemens was producing and selling generators and Rathenau built power stations and laid cables. In 1883 he founded the "German Edison Corporation for Applied Electricity" (Deutsche Edison-Gesellschaft für angewandte Elektrizität), which in 1887 changed into the Allgemeine Elektrizitäts-Gesellschaft (General Electricity Incorporated) abbreviated AEG.

On 19 February 1884 Rathenau and the magistrate of Berlin signed an agreement on the electrification of the city. While he financed the deal, Rathenau's private company was also permitted to use public streets to lay electricity lines. The city received 10% of the income for giving its authorization, and the first power station went online to illuminate the 'Gendarmenmarkt' at night. Peter Becker, a German energy expert, called this Germany's first private-public partnership. The Berlin model became influential throughout the German Empire.

In 1903, Rathenau was appointed general manager of AEG. Together with his competitor and business partner, they formed the Telefunken Gesellschaft für drahtlose Telegraphie mbH. He held numerous positions on the supervisory board of Berliner Handels-Gesellschaft und der Elektrizitäts AG vorm. W. Lahmeyer & Co.

In 1907, Rathenau established the German South West African Mining Syndicate in what is now Namibia and also established a research company to study irrigation problems.

One of his sons was Walther Rathenau, an industrialist, politician, and progressive economist who served as German Foreign Minister during the Weimar Republic. He was assassinated in Berlin in June 1922 by the right-wing terrorist group Organisation Consul. He had another son named Erich Rathenau and a daughter Edith.

== Literature ==
- Armin Chodzinski: Kunst und Wirtschaft. Peter Behrens, Emil Rathenau und der dm drogerie markt. Kulturverlag Kadmos, Berlin 2007, ISBN 978-3-8659-9030-3, S. 94–115.
- Markus Dahlem: Fallstudien zum Verhältnis von Banken und Großunternehmen im Deutschen Kaiserreich, 1871–1914. Die Farbenfabriken vormals Friedrich Bayer & Co. in Leverkusen und die Allgemeine Elektrizitäts-Gesellschaft. (PDF; 218 kB) In: Akkumulation. Informationen des Arbeitskreises für kritische Unternehmens- und Industriegeschichte. Ruhr-Univ. Bochum; 19, Bochum, 2004, S. 1–28.
- Jesko Dahlmann: Das innovative Unternehmertum im Sinne Schumpeters: Theorie und Wirtschaftsgeschichte. Metropolis Verlag, Marburg 2017, ISBN 978-3-7316-1269-8, S. 141–191.
- Ursula Mader: Emil und Walther Rathenau in der elektrochemischen Industrie (1888–1907). Eine historische Studie (= Gesellschaft, Geschichte, Gegenwart, Band 20), Trafo-Verlag Weist, Berlin 2001, ISBN 3-89626-198-3.
- Manfred Pohl: Emil Rathenau und die AEG. Verlag von Hase & Koehler, Mainz 1988, ISBN 3-7758-1190-7, mit zahlreichen Bildern und Faksimiles
- Manfred Pohl (2003). "Rathenau, Emil Moritz". Neue Deutsche Biographie (in German). Vol. 21. Berlin: Duncker & Humblot. pp. 172–173. (full text online).

== See also ==
- Rathenau
