= Rathenau =

Rathenau is a German locational surname, named after the obsolete spelling for the town of Rathenow in Brandenburg. The name may refer to:

- Emil Rathenau (1838–1915), German industrialist
- Gerhart Rathenau (1911–1989), Dutch scientist
- Walther Rathenau (1867–1922), German industrialist and politician

== Other uses ==
- Walther Rathenau Institut, a thinktank in Berlin

== See also ==
- Ratner (disambiguation)
