= Carl Ratner =

American cultural psychologist (born 1943)

- Born: April 17, 1943 (age 83); New York, United States
- Education: University of Wisconsin; State University of New York at Buffalo
- Known for: Qualitative research Work of Lev Vygotsky
- Awards: Fulbright Fellowship at Jawaharlal Nehru University (2006–2007)
- Scientific career
- Fields: Cultural psychology
- Institutions: Humboldt State University; Universidad Autónoma del Estado de Morelos
- Thesis: Interpersonal Perception: A Study in Reciprocal Attitude Change (1970)

Carl Ratner (born April 17, 1943) is an American cultural psychologist. He is the Director of the Institute for Cultural Research and Education in the United States and an adjunct professor at the Universidad Autónoma del Estado de Morelos in Cuernavaca, Morelos, Mexico. He is a member of the International Association for Cross-Cultural Psychology. He is known for his theory of "macro cultural psychology", which is based on the works of Soviet psychologist Lev Vygotsky. He was a Fulbright Fellow at Jawaharlal Nehru University from 2006 to 2007.
