= Walter Curt Behrendt =

German-American architect (1884–1945)

Walter Curt Behrendt (December 16, 1884 – April 26, 1945) was a German-American architect and active advocate of German modernism. He was an authority on city planning and housing, editor of Die Form, and author of The Victory of the New Building Style among many other works.

Behrendt was born in Metz, emigrated to the U.S. in 1934 to teach at Dartmouth College through the help of his friend Lewis Mumford, and died in Norwich, Vermont.

== Selected literary works ==
- Alfred Messel, intro. Karl Scheffler. Berlin: Bruno Cassirer, 1911. Reprint: Gebr.Mann, Berlin 1998.
- Die einheitliche Blockfront als Raumelement im Stadtbau. Berlin: Bruno Cassirer, 1911.
- Der Kampf um den Stil im Kunstgewerbe und in der Architektur. Stuttgart/Berlin: Deutsche Verlags-Anstalt, 1920.
- Der Sieg des neuen Baustils. Stuttgart: Akademischer Verlag Dr. Fritz Wedekind & Co., 1927. Translated as: The Victory of the New Building Style, intro. Detlef Mertins, trans. Harry F. Mallgrave. Texts & Documents. Los Angeles: Getty Research Institute, 2000.
- Modern Building. Its Nature, Problems, and Forms. New York: Harcourt, Brace and Co., 1937.
