= Iosif Ratner =

Soviet military adviser

Iosif Markovich Ratner
- Born: 26 August 1901; Shumyachi, Mogilev Governorate; Russian Empire (now in Smolensk Oblast, Russia)
- Died: 20 March 1953 (aged 51); Moscow, Russian SFSR; Soviet Union
- Military career
- Allegiance: Soviet Union
- Branch: Red Army / Soviet Army
- Service years: 1919–1953
- Rank: Major-general
- Commands: 13th Mechanized Regiment (June–September 1936)
- Conflicts: Russian Civil War; Spanish Civil War (adviser); Second Sino-Japanese War (adviser); World War II

Iosif Markovich Ratner (Russian: Ио́сиф Ма́ркович Ра́тнер; 26 August 1901 – 20 March 1953) was a Soviet military adviser with the Soviet embassies in Republican Spain and China during the Spanish Civil War and Second Sino-Japanese War.

A veteran of the Russian Civil War and 1929 graduate of the Frunze Military Academy, he was awarded the rank of major-general in 1944. He taught at the Voroshilov General Staff Academy as a senior instructor during and after World War II.

== Biography ==
Iosif Ratner was born to Jewish parents in the village of Shumyachi in the Mogilev Governorate of the Russian Empire (now in Mogilev Oblast, Belarus) in 1901. He joined the Bolshevik Party in 1918.

He joined the Red Army as a soldier in 1919 and was promoted to platoon commander in November 1919. Captured by the White Army in May 1920, he was held as a prisoner of the Whites until November 1920, but rejoined the Reds and served as a platoon commander on the Southwestern Front in 1920–1922. He studied at an infantry school in Poltava in 1923-1926 and attended the Frunze Military Academy in Moscow in 1926–1929, graduating from the Frunze Academy in June 1929.

Ratner was a battalion commander's deputy in 1929 and a tank company commander in 1929–1930. He was a student of armored warfare in Weimar Germany in 1930, becoming fluent in the German, French, and Polish languages.

Appointed commander of the 13th Mechanized Regiment in June 1936, just prior to the outbreak of civil war in Spain, Ratner was posted as a military adviser to Republican Spain three months later. He served as an assistant to the military attaché at the Soviet embassy in Spain from September 1936 to November 1937, and as an assistant to the Soviet military attaché at the Soviet embassy in China during the Second Sino-Japanese War from November 1937 to October 1939.

Returning to the Frunze Military Academy as an instructor in February 1940, he was promoted to senior instructor in April 1941. He was next named Deputy Chief at the 7th Section of the Main Directorate of Formation and Staffing from January to March 1942 and Senior Inspector for the 1st Section of the Main Directorate of Formation and Staffing from March to October 1942.

Ratner joined the staff of the Voroshilov General Staff Academy as a senior instructor in 1943. Promoted to major-general in 1944, he remained at the Voroshilov Academy for the final decade of his life. He died in Moscow on 20 March 1953.
