= Gamm family, Bydgoszcz - Gdańsk =

Prussian and Polish business dynasty

Gamm
- Family
- Current region: Kingdom of Prussia, Gdańsk, Poland
- Origin: Sulechów, Bydgoszcz
- Founder: Markus Gamm (1560-1651)
- Historic seat: Bydgoszcz, Gdańsk
- Members: Johann Friedrich Wilhelm, Johann Carl Benjamin, Johann Eduard Gustav August, Johann Georg Heinrich Julius, Friedrich Emil

The Gamm family was a dynasty of entrepreneurs from Sulechów, (then part of the Kingdom of Prussia), who were active in Prussia and northern Poland, from the mid-19th century till the end of WWII. They established the first soap and candle fafctory in Bydgoszcz. In addition, the family had a quasi monopoly of the production and trade of soap and candles in Gdańsk till 1945. Furthermore, many of its members were involved in the local political life.

== Family origins ==
The Gamm family roots find their origin in the town of Züllichau (Sulechów, north of Zielona Góra County), as attested by records from the 17th century. The earliest known ancester is Markus Gamm (1560-1651). Several Gamm generations can be tracked back there: Adam, Michael, Michael Adam (1693-1744) and Joseph Samuel, father of Johann Friedrich Wilhelm Gamm.

== Johann Friedrich Gamm (Sulechów-Bydgoszcz) ==
Johann Friedrich was born on 27 March 1763 in the family town of Züllichau, from Joseph Samuel and Dorothea Elisabeth Wilke. In 1780, he moved from Züllichau to Bydgoszcz (then Bromberg) and established there a soap and candle factory in 1788. It was the first factory in Bromberg to introduce more refined varieties of soap instead of the semi-liquid gray soap. It was located on what later became GammStraße (today's Warmińskiego Street). The company had its own shop, located on the Old Market Square.

He married Johanna Florentina Fitzke (3 April 1768, Piła–2 August 1834, Sopot). The couple had 10 children, 5 daughters and 5 sons:

- Johanna Florentine (20 September 1787-26 October 1822, Bydgoszcz), who married Carl Friedrich Schwabe;
- Johann Samuel Ludwig (see below);
- Johann Friedrich Wilhelm (see below);
- Johanna Dorothea Elisabeth (born on 16 November 1792, Bydgoszcz);
- Johann Carl Benjamin (see below);
- Johanna Henrietta Wilhelmine (born on 9 October 1799, Bydgoszcz);
- Johann Eduard Gustav August (see below);
- Johanna Charlotte Mathilde (born on 14 November 1802, Bydgoszcz);
- Johanna Rosamunda Emilie (born on 9 April 1806 Bydgoszcz);
- Johann Georg Heinrich Julius (see below).

Johann Friedrich died on 19 May 1834 in Bydgoszcz.

== Johann Samuel Ludwig Gamm (Bydgoszcz-Königsberg) ==
Born in Bromberg on 20 June 1789, Johann Samuel moved to Königsberg (today's Kaliningrad) and opened there a soap and candle factory, Seifenfabrik L. Gamm & Sohn .

Purchased in 1812 by Paul Hüter and Felix Japha, the company continued to operate till the outset of WWII. During the conflict, it has been working under Nazi administration, using slave labor.

== Johann Friedrich Wilhelm Gamm (Bydgoszcz-Gdańsk) ==
Johann Friedrich Wilhelm was born on 7 February 1791 in Bromberg.

He moved to Gdańsk in October 1814: the following year, he purchased a tenement house at 279 Hundegasse (present day 58 Ogarna street) from Georg Grabovius, a merchant. The purchase comprised an annex at 194 Dienergasse (32 Służebna street, no longer extant), where he established a soap and candle factory. The plant, based on modern production technology, soon thrived. The factory expanded and moved after WWI to 130 Szeroka Street, where once stood the city Old Synagogue. It was destroyed during WWII; at the plot now is the Dariusz Kobzdej Square.

Together with the companies of his brothers who settled also in Gdańsk, the Gamm family dominated for many years the production and sale of soap, laundry products and

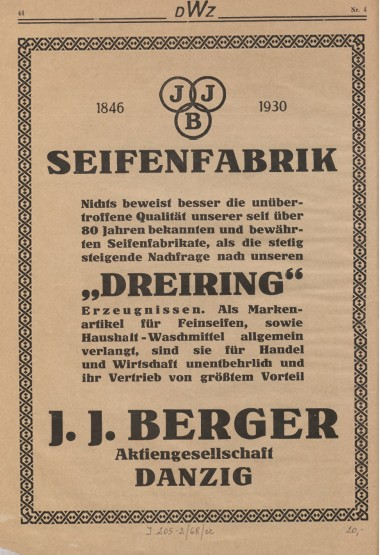
Ad for JJ Berger soap Company, 1930

candles in the city.

In 1822, Johann Friedrich co-founded the city Merchants' Corporation with his brother Carl Benjamin and remained a member until 1846. He passed away in Gdańsk, on 5 December 1858. In 1846, with no direct successors, Johann Friedrich Wilhelm decided to sell the house at Hundegasse as well as the factory, to Johann Isidor Berger, who married his daughter Otylia in 1853. Johann Berger ran the company under the name "JJ Berger Seifenfabrik" until 1906. This year, he passed it to his descendants (Felix Berger, then Franz Berger) who ran it, operating from 1922 to 1945 as a joint-stock company (Seifen–Fabrik JJ Berger Aktiengesellschaft).

=== Family and descendants ===
Johann Friedrich Wilhelm Gamm was married to Christiana Florentina Schwabe (14 September 1793, Bydgoszcz – 21 March 1871, Gdańsk). Among the offspring, the following children have been recorded:

- Rosa Louisa (born 14 February 1821, Gdańsk);
- Albert Emil (born 24 January 1823, Gdańsk), who moved to Marienburg in 1846 and then to Braunsberg in Ostpreußen in December 1852;
- Maria Angelica (14 December 1827–28 August 1891, Gdańsk);
- Otylia Florentina (5 March 1832–1908, Gdańsk), married to Johann Isidor Berger.

== Johann Carl Benjamin Gamm (Gdańsk) ==
Born in Bromberg on 22 February 1794, Carl followed the path of his brother Samuel Ludwig and moved to Gdańsk in 1814 in order to open another soap and candle factory. He associated with Hermann van Almonde and used the former Szeroka Gate building (Brama Szeroka) to house his plant. After the demolition of the gate in 1831, the factory was re-built on the same plot, on Breitgasse (at today's 132 Szeroka street).

In 1818, he married his cousin, Julianna Justyna Gamm, (born in Frankfurt (Oder) on 20 March 20 1798). Together with Samuel Ludwig, he co-founded the city Merchants' Corporation in 1822, remaining a member until his death. From 1824 to 1841, he was also a member of the Rada Miasta Gdańska. In 1840, he represented the city of Gdańsk at the Prussian provincial assembly in Königsberg.

Johann Carl Benjamin died on 9 November 1841 in Gdańsk, at the early age of 48. After his death, his wife Julianna managed the company for several years on behalf of her minor children. She died in Gdańsk on 2 July 1852.

=== Family and descendants ===
Julianna Justyna and Carl Benjamin had 3 daughters and one son:

- Emma Rosamunda Mathilda (born 1821), who wed Heinrich August Wilhelm Eickhoff in 1843;
- Julius Cäsar, heir of the fatory (see below);
- Augusta Maria Natalia (30 April 1831–died after 1900 in Gdańsk). She married Louis Ferdinand Plageman, a merchant, on 22 July 1850;
- Otilia Maria Clara (born on 24 February 1834, in Gdańsk). She moved to Erfurt on 4 November 1857 to marry his husband.

=== Julius Cäsar Gamm ===
Julius Cäsar was born on 12 May 1825, in Gdańsk. He inherited the family-run soap and candle factory, together with a currency exchange office set up in his own tenement house at 128-132 Breitgasse (Szeroka street).

On 12 June 1846, he decided to end the partnership with his father's colleague, Hermann van Almonde. The new company was rebranded J.C. Gamm and dealt with wholesale grain business. On 19 June 1858, a major city fire burned down his tenement house and the currency office. Julius Cäsar had to sell the ruined property on Szeroka Street to his uncle Johann Eduard Gustav.

With the benefits, he could purchase a tenement house at 115 Heilige-Geist-Gasse (today's 41/43 św. Ducha Street); he installed his business and the currency exchange office there. From 1865 to 1870, he served as a member of the City Council (Rada Miasta Gdańska). Furthermore, he was a long-time member of the Gdańsk Merchants' Association. Julius Cäsar Gamm died on 2 February 1895.

In April 1853, he had married Johanna Mathilde Schwabe (11 February 1834, Kwidzyn–22 December 1920, Gdańsk). They had 3 children:

- Elisabeth (15 October 1856–5 September 1939, Gdańsk) who married in 1880, Richard Reutener, a banker;
- Johann Carl (born on 17 April 1858), who married in 1889, Margarethe Friederike Marianne Weichbrod (1869-1928);
- Adelaide who died young at the age of 6 (12 July 1868-18 April 1875). She is buried with her parents at the St. Mary's Cemetery.

== Johann Eduard Gustav August Gamm (Gdańsk) ==
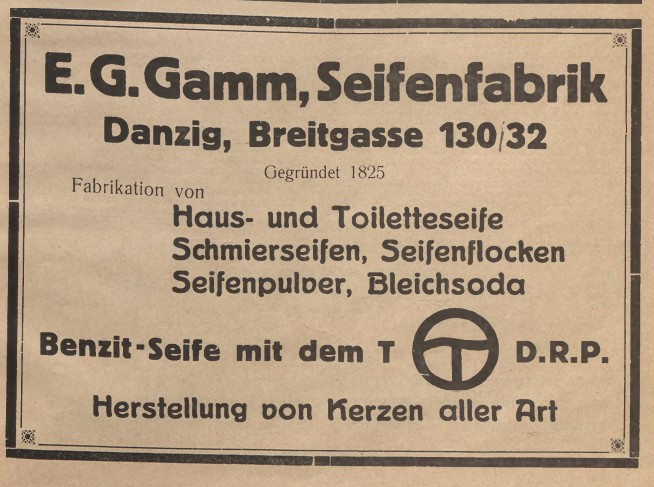
Ad for EG Gamm, 1930

Eduard Gustav was born on 18 May 1801, in Bydgoszcz. He moved in his youth to Gdańsk. Around 1823, he purchased Carl Friedrich Hohenfeldt's soap factory, located on Damm strasse (today's 7 Grobla Street): he had it razed to construct a brand new plant producing soap, candle, and industrial oil factory, which started operating on 18 October 1825: the E.G. Gamm company. In August the same year, Eduard Gustav received the citizenship of the city.

On 2 July 1858, he opened a branch of his business at 132 Breitgasse, where other members of the Gamm family were already installed. He entrusted this branch's management to his son Johann Friedrich Oscar.

Between 1835-1838 and 1844–1860, Eduard Gustav was a member of the Gdańsk City Council. He died on 26 March 1874.

He married Friederika Emilia Bigalke (21 February 1802, Bydgoszcz-23 December 1878, Gdańsk). They had 6 children:

- Maria (born on 9 July 1826), who wed in 1849, Franz Jacob Genschow (1819–1890), owning estates in Młyniska and Królewska Dolina;
- Gustav Egmont (born on 17 September 1827). He went to Berlin in March 1847. Once back to Gdańsk, he worked in his father's company from 1855 to 1867, before moving to Berlin again as a merchant in 1890;
- Friedrich Wilhelm Julius (born 3 August 1834);
- Ida Mathilda (18 February 1829-27 July 1899), wife of the merchant Karl Hildebrandt (1815-1873);
- Johann Friedrich Oscar (1835-1593), heir to the company (see below);
- Emilia Ida Rosamunda (1 February 1837-31 March 1880) who remained a spinsterhood.

=== Johann Friedrich Oscar Gamm ===
Friedrich Oscar was born on 29 March 1835 in Gdańsk. In 1858, he received from his father the management of a branch of his company producing soap, washing powder, and cosmetics, along with the shop at 132 Breitgasse (Szeroka Street). After his father's death in 1874, he moved the E.G. Gamm company headquarters in Szeroka street.

In 1888, he expanded the plant by purchasing land from the old wooden synagogue that had burned down in the 1858 city fire. After 1900, Friedrich Oscar modernized his manufacture by installing electric generators.

From 1887 to 1892, he was a member of the City Council. A music enthusiast, he was a member of an amateur male quartet; he performed at numerous concerts and events with Georg Ferdinand Reutener, Richard Reutener and Leonhard Drewitz. In 1879, he was one of the founders of the Danziger Männergesangverein (Gdańsk Men's Choir) and served as its chairman until his death, which happened on 12 May 1893.

==== Family and descendants ====
Friedrich Oscar married a first time in 1858, to his cousin Emilia Rosemunda Gamm from Bydgoszcz (1836–31 January 1880), with whom he had 5 sons and a daughter, among whom:

- Emil, who went to Vienna where he learned the trade of a soap maker;
- Fritz, who traveled to the USA to live there;
- Heinrich Julius, who became a brewer;
- Benno Albert Julius (9 February 1863–died after 1892), who was a watchmaker in Gdańsk;
- Emilia Elsa, married to Walter Fischer, a photographer.

After the death of his wife Emilia, Johann Friedrich espoused on 24 September 1883, Bertha Elisabeth (10 April 1853 Wrocław-died after 1925), the daughter of Rudolf Winzer, a musician from Königsberg. The couple had 3 children:

- Rudolf Eduard (28 October 1884-2 April 1961 in Sopot). In 1935, he became a member of the Volkstag, representing the DNVP. Although persecuted by the Nazis, Rudolf remained in Gdańsk during and after WWII. In 1948, he participated in the trial of Albert Forster. Rudolf wrote his memoirs Swastika over Gdańsk (Swastyka nad Gdańskiem) in 1960.
- Franz Kurt (22 February 1886-died after 1928);
- Karl Egmont (8 March 1890–died after 1945).

After Friedrich Oscar's demise (1 October 1915), his widow, Berta Winzer-Gamm, became the owner and manager of the company on behalf of her minor sons, pursuant to Oscar's will. In 1900, she remarried, to master carpenter Ludwig Bähring from Königsberg, who became co-owner of the company. They settled together in Königsberg.

On 1 October 1900, Bruno Bähring (1865-1915), Ludwig's son, took over the management of the company's current operations. After his death, Berta Bähring-Gamm handed over the firm administration to her son Karl Egmont on 1 October 1915.

In 1908, a new two-story tenement house with an ornate facade was erected on the family premises, comprising a basement used for production purposes, a shop on the ground floor, the company office and apartments on the upper floors. The ensemble at then 130-132 Breitgasse was destroyed in 1945. On the spot now stands the Dariusz Kobzdej Square. The Polish city authorities allowed the family company operations to resume for a while, under the direction of Rudolf Eduard, re-branded Gdańskie Zakłady Chemiczne Gatra R. Gamm i S-ka (November 1947).

== Johann Georg Heinrich Julius Gamm (Bydgoszcz) ==
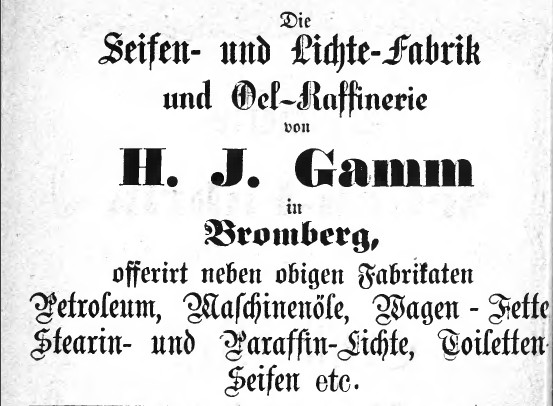
Advertising for the Gamm Company in 1869

Johann Georg Heinrich Julius was born on 10 June 1807, in Bromberg. In 1829, he inherited the family factory, which he re-branded H. J. Gamm Soap and Candle Factory. The business flourished and gained an excellent reputation in the city and even beyond. Its core production relied on tallow and wax candles, which were appreciated by city residents. It also supplied local offices such as the seat of the Bydgoszcz Regency, the city hall, the courts and the post office. Personally, Heinrich Julius lived at 79 Markt Platz (today's 14/16 Old Market Square).

In the 1860s, these candles, then the main light source, were replaced by candles made from stearin and paraffin wax. In addition, the need for products like kerosene for oil lamps started to grow. Following the demand, the Gamm company also increased the production of a new, higher-quality hard soap, which easily replaced the initial manufactured soft soap.

In 1868, the plot of land adjacent to the factory was purchased : using both premises, the new company's headquarters were constructed there. A small vinegar producing workshop was later erected in the backyard. In the 1880s, Heinrich Julius handed over the firm to his youngest son, Friedrich Emil.

Competition was harshed on the soap and candle business in Bromberg: out of more than 5 firms in 1880, only 3 remained operating in 1900 (Gamm, Böhlke and Mix).

On 29 August 1888, the city council of Bromberg awarded him the title of Honorary Citizen of Bydgoszcz (Honorowi obywatele Bydgoszczy), on the occasion of the 100th anniversary of the company. Heinrich Gamm died on 3 January 1892, in Bromberg. He was married to Johanne Rosemunde Emilie Schwabe. The couple had 5 children, three daughters and two sons.

=== Friedrich Emil Gamm ===
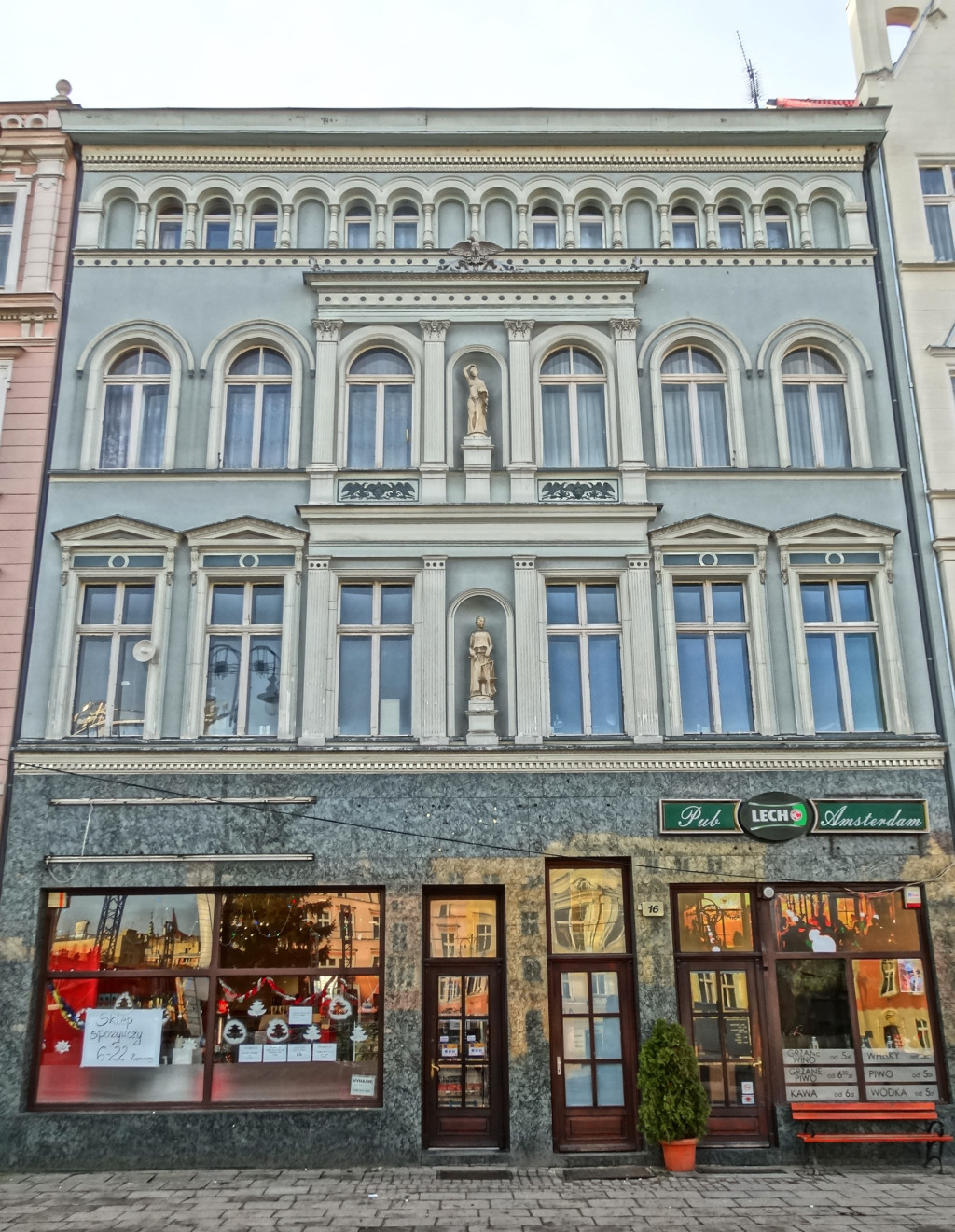
View of the Gamm tenement house at 16 Old Market Square

Born in 1842, Friedrich Emil was the last family member in Bromberg to run the Gamm business. He was a city councilor and a member of the city magistrate. His wife's father was also a soap manufacturer and city councilor, Emanuel Gottfried Robert Meyer.

In addition, Emil was a devoted philanthropist:

- member of the local Red Cross;
- contributor to the funding of the construction of St. Paul's Evangelical Church;
- founder of a foundation (Emil Gamm-Stiftung) serving the poorest residents of Bromberg, regardless of their social background or religion.

He passed away on 15 February 1908. Friedrich Emil Gamm was buried in the city Evangelical Cemetery on Wilhelmstrasse (today's Wincenty Witos Park on Jagiellońska Street).

In 2012, the city authorities unveiled an Emil Gamm street (Ulica Emila Gamma) to commemorate the importance of the Gamm family business in the history of Bydgoszcz .

== Fragmentary family tree ==
Bydgoszcz branch / Gdańsk branch

- Markus Gamm (1560-1651)
  - Adam Gamm
    - Michael Gamm
      - Michael Adam Gamm (1693-1744)
        - Joseph Samuel Gamm
          - Johann Friedrich Gamm (1763-1834)
            - Johanna Florentine Gamm (1787-1822)
            - Johann Samuel Ludwig Gamm
            - Johann Friedrich Wilhelm Gamm
              - Rosa Louisa
              - Albert Emil
              - Maria Angelica
              - Otylia Florentina Berger
                - Felix Berger
                  - Franz Berger
            - Johanna Dorothea Elisabeth Gamm
            - Johann Carl Benjamin Gamm
              - Emma Rosamunda Mathilda
              - Augusta Maria Natalia
              - Otilia Maria Clara
              - Julius Caësar
                - Elisabeth
                - Adelaide
                - Johann Carl
            - Johanna Henrietta Wilhelmine Gamm
            - Johann Eduard Gustav August Gamm
              - Maria
              - Gustav Egmont
              - Friedrich Wilhelm Julius
              - Ida Mathilda
              - Johann Friedrich Oscar Gamm
                - Emil
                - Fritz
                - Heinrich Julius
                - Benno Albert Julius
                - Emilia Elsa
                - Rudolf Eduard
                - Franz Kurt
                - Karl Egmont
              - Emilia Ida Rosamunda
            - Johanna Charlotte Mathilde
            - Johanna Rosamunda Emilia married Heinrich Wilhelm König.
            - Johann Georg Heinrich Julius Gamm
              - Friedrich Emil Gamm
              - Wilhelm

== See also ==
- Bydgoszcz
- Doktora Emila Warmińskiego street
- Old Market Square, Bydgoszcz
- Honorowi obywatele Bydgoszczy
- Gdańsk
- Gdańsk City Council

== Bibliography ==
- Błażejewski, Stanisław; Kutta, Janusz; Romaniuk, Marek (1994). Bydgoski Słownik Biograficzny. Tom I [Bydgoszcz Biographical Dictionary. Volume I] (in Polish). Bydgoszcz: Kujawsko-Pomorskie Towarzystwo Kulturalne. pp. 51–52. ISBN 83-85327-27-4.
