= Gdańsk City Council =

Local government body in Gdańsk, Poland

Gdańsk City Council Rada Miasta Gdańska

Type
- Type: Unicameral

Leadership
- Chairwoman: Agnieszka Owczarczak, KO
- Vice-Chairmen: Mateusz Skarbek, KO; Piotr Dzik, WdG; Karol Rabenda, PiS

Structure
- Seats: 34
- Political groups: Mayoral coalition (25): Civic Coalition (16); All for Gdańsk (9); All for Gdańsk (8); New Left (1); Opposition (8): Law and Justice (8); Vacant (1): Vacant (1)

Elections
- Voting system: Multi-member electoral districts with five-year terms
- Last election: 7 April 2024
- Next election: 2029

Website
- www.gdansk.pl/rada-miasta-gdanska

The Gdańsk City Council is the governing body of the city of Gdańsk in Poland. The council has 37 elected members elected every five years in an election by city voters through a secret ballot. The election of City Council and the local head of government, which takes place at the same time, is based on legislation introduced on 20 June 2002.

== Election results ==
=== 2024 ===
All 34 seats on the city council were being contested in the 2024 election.

Party	Votes	%	Seats
Civic Coalition	102,624	57.78	25
Law and Justice	37,555	21.14	8
Common Gdańsk Way 2050 (Note: Common Gdańsk Way 2050 is a coalition of PL2050, The Left and local associations.)	14,298	8.05	1
I Love Gdańsk – Independent Candidates	7,698	4.33	0
Confederation Nonpartisans There is One Poland for Pomerania	7,697	4.33	0
Social Gdańsk – City for People	5,464	3.08	0
Mariusz Andrzejczak for Gdańsk	2,209	1.24	0
Slavic Union	69	0.04	0
Total	177,614	100.00	34
