= Wincenty Witos Park, Bydgoszcz =

Urban park, 20th century, Bydgoszcz, Poland

Wincenty Witos Park
- Ludowy Park
- Polish: Park Ludowy im. Wincentego Witosa w Bydgoszczy
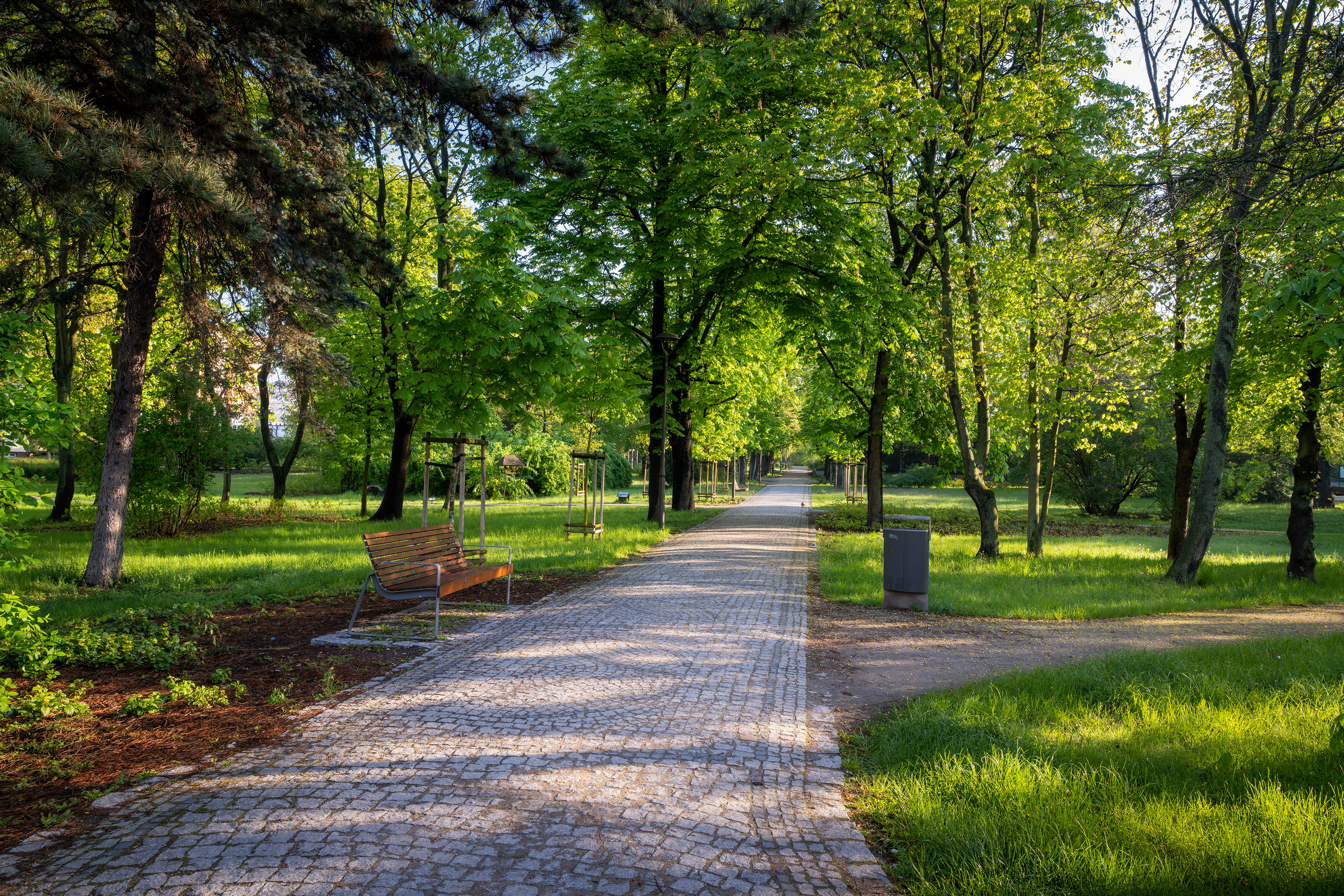
- Renovated Ludowy Park in Bydgoszcz
- Interactive map of Wincenty Witos Park
- Location: Bydgoszcz, Poland
- Coordinates: 53°07′28″N 18°00′47″E
- Area: 6.42 hectares (15.9 acres)
- Created: 1953
- Owner: City of Bydgoszcz

Wincenty Witos Ludowy Park is a 6.42 hectares (15.9 acres) urban park in downtown district of Bydgoszcz, Poland.

== Location ==
The park is located in downtown Bydgoszcz, surrounded by the following streets:

- Jagiellońska in the south;
- Maksymiliana Piotrowskiego in the east;
- Markwarta in the north.

The area has a roughly rectangle shape, 250 metres (820 ft) by 275 metres (902 ft) and stands between the Youth Palace (Polish: Pałac Młodzieży) at 27 Jagiellońska street and the Basilica of St. Vincent de Paul.

It has been named after Wincenty Witos (1874-1945), a Polish politician, activist of the Peasant movement and three times Prime Minister.

== History ==
=== Protestant cemetery ===
The Ludowy Park (People's Park) was established on the site of a Protestant cemetery. The latter dated back to 1778 and was the oldest and the largest in Bydgoszcz.

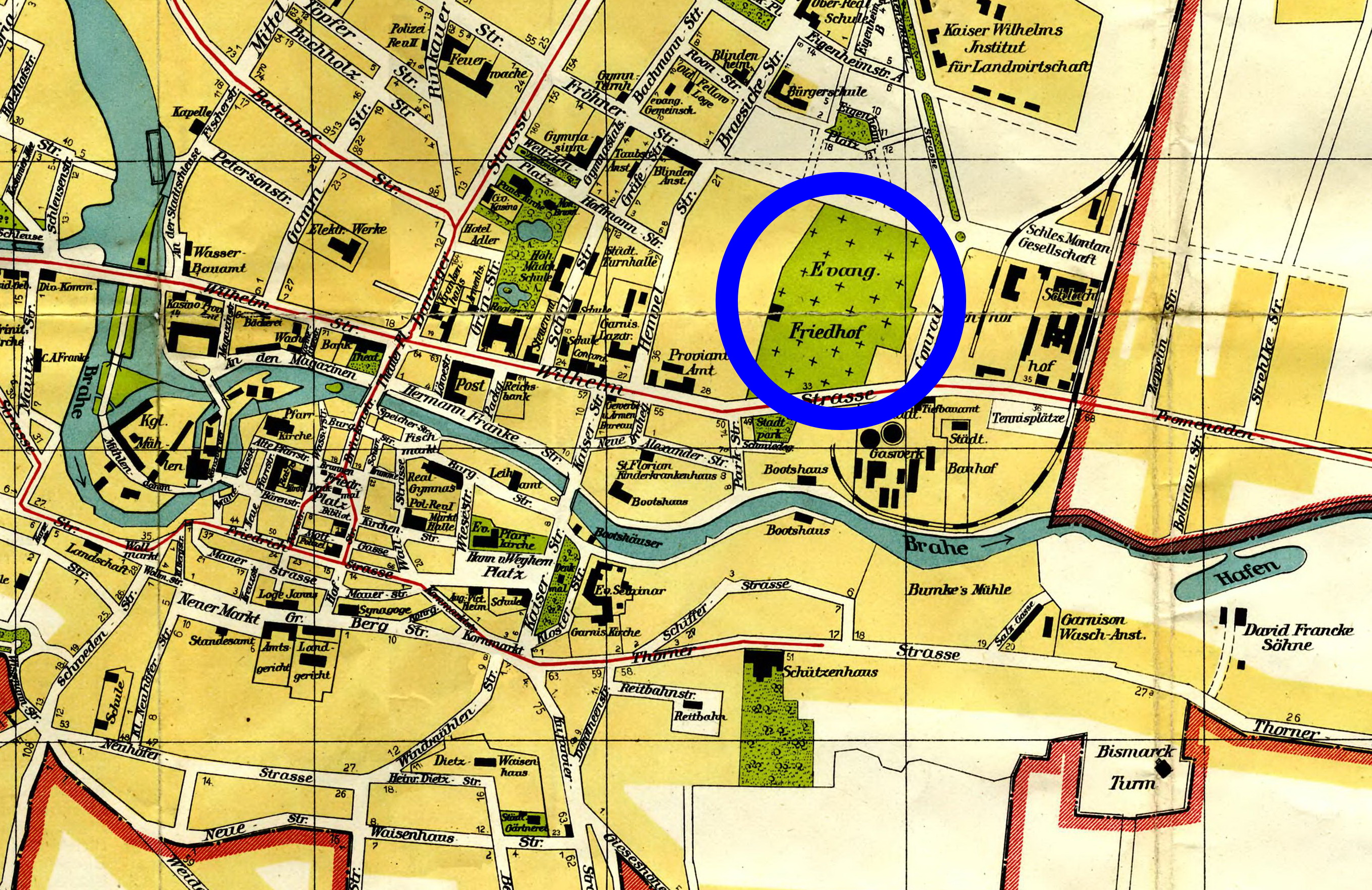
The cemetery on a 1914 map of Bromberg

The area for the cemetery, purchased from the Grodztwo estate, was later expanded and eventually covered a surface of 6.5 hectares (16 acres). In 1838, a residential house for the administrator was erected on the premises, where a separate room was used as a morgue. In 1884, a chapel was built and in 1898, a massive brick fence. That latter survived until the liquidation of the cemetery.

Four forged gates opened onto the streets: two onto Jagiellońska and two onto Markwarta. Inside the site, 8 metres (26 ft) wide roads, flanked with lindens, ran from the gates, leading to the chapel located on a large central square. A network of paths beaming out from the center divided the cemetery into quarters.

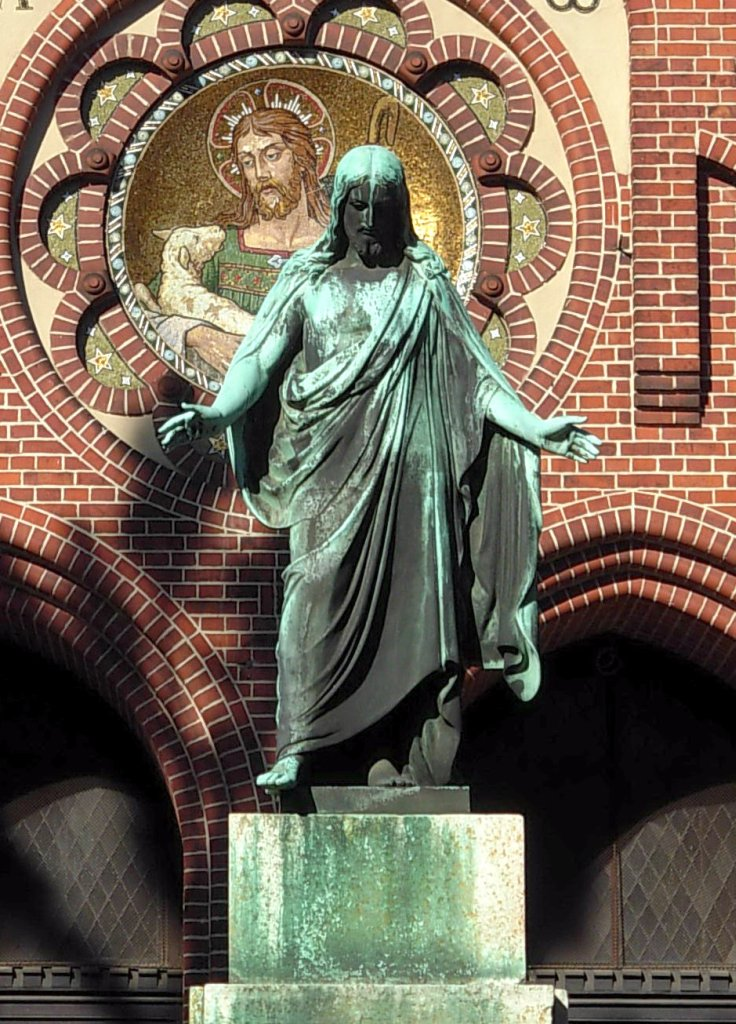
Statue "Christ the Savior" on the front yard of Bydgoszcz Lutheran Church

The place was teeming with greenery:

- around the square oaks and chestnuts;
- in the quarters common beeches, pubescent, sessile and red oaks, robinias, birches, largeleaf lindens;
- along the fencing Norway, blue and white spruces;
- near the gardener house catalpa trees.

In 1938, a survey listed 66 species of trees and shrubs in the cemetery.

Although many people of merit, mainly of German nationality, found their resting place here, in 1927, Polish authorities decided the liquidation of the cemetery, pleading in the one hand a significant reduction of Evangelicals in the city (after the recreation of Polish state) and on the other hand the plan to rebuild the surrounding streets for sanitary reasons. The municipal decision was appealed against to the Supreme Administrative Tribunal which in 1934, denied the will of the municipal authorities.

After the end of WWII and the liberation of Bydgoszcz in 1945, the old cemetery was definitively closed. Protestants were offered plots at the Evangelical-Augsburg cemetery in Zaświat street. The eventual liquidation of the old gravesite, started in 1946, was completed in 1953. The last exhumation to be moved to the Zaświat street site was held in 1956. During the liquidation, many artifacts were lost or destroyed: tombstones, sculptures, reliefs, catacombs. It included family tombs and resting place of famous personages: Theodor Gottlieb von Hippel the Younger (1775-1843), Carl and Wilhelm Blumwe, city successful entrepreneurs, who saw only their grave sculpture preserved (a copy of Bertel Thorvaldsen's statue of Christ the Savior) and moved to the front square of the Lutheran Church of the Savior in Bydgoszcz. The work piece is still standing nowadays.

=== Ludowy Park ===
As the cemetery closed, a municipal urban park named Ludowy Park (People's Park) was established in its very place, boasting the old greenery left from the necropolis. In 1956, an acoustical shell was erected on the premises, with facilities for band performances. Afterwards were constructed around the area:

- three apartment blocks on the western edge of the park;
- pavilions on the eastern side, hosting the Bydgoszcz Automobile Club and a café, "Parkowa";
- on the southern end, the Youth Palace in 1974.

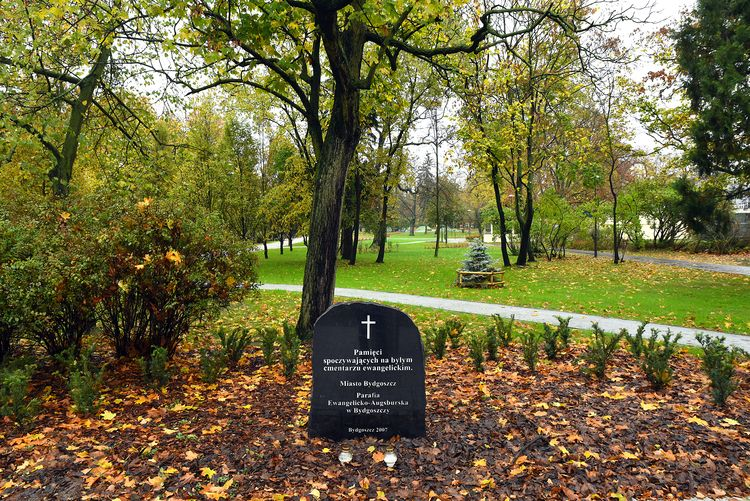
Cemetery monument after renovation

On June 3, 1984, on the initiative of the United People's Party, the park was named after Polish politician Wincenty Witos. For the occasion, a bust of the activist was unveiled: it had been realized by Witold Marciniak and funded by the peasants from the Bydgoszcz Voivodeship. Furthermore, between this monument and the concert shell, a circular fountain was built.

In 2007, several elements of the park were renovated (park alleys, concert shell) and the greenery was restored. During these works, a monument commemorating the ancient Protestant cemetery was unveiled on April 24, 2007. It consists of a black granite, placed in the south-eastern corner of the compound, which bears the following inscription:

Pamięci spoczywających na byłym cmentarzu ewangelickim.

In memory of those resting at the former Evangelical cemetery.
City of Bydgoszcz
Evangelical-Augsburg Parish in Bydgoszcz

Bydgoszcz 2007

== Characteristics ==
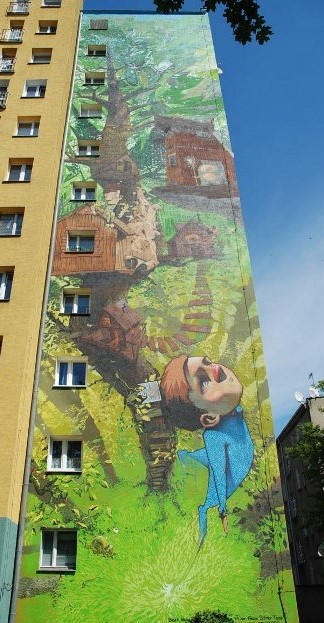
Mural "Peter Pan"

The park is equipped with a network of paths with benches, tennis courts and children playgrounds.

In July 2009, the-then largest mural in the country was created near the park. After a week of work, nine young artists from Bydgoszcz, Olsztyn and Łódź realized a painting depicting Peter Pan under a tree with fairy-tale characters.

=== Outdoor concert shell ===
The now gone open-air theatre was built in 1956, as a replacement of an amphitheater erected in nearby Kazimierz Wielki Park in 1946, to house events and concerts organized on the occasion of the 600th anniversary of Bydgoszcz's founding.

In the 1980s, the interest in this concert stage decreased, with the competition of another open-air arena set up at the Zawisza stadium.

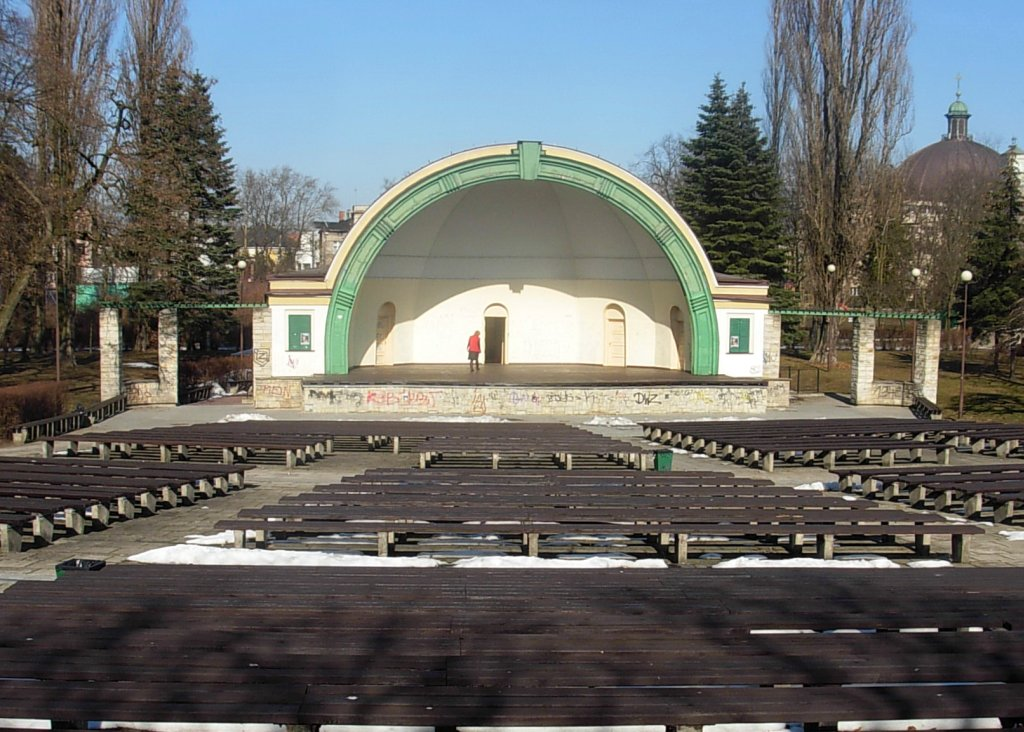
Nonexistent shell theatre

A survey carried out by experts in December 2016, highlighted the poor technical condition of the facility, down to its foundations. The prohibitive revitalization costs (3 to 4 million PLN) led to its closure, which happened in December 2017.

=== Natural values ===
The park is mainly wooded by native tree species: maples, lindens, hornbeams and oaks. One can mention in particular a conical variety of common hornbeam, a common catalpa and a Honey locust. Along the avenue are planted, among others, Norway maple trees, horse chestnuts, black pines, blue spruces Lombardi poplars.

Polish Natural Monuments In the park and its close surroundings are identified five specimens of Polish Natural Monuments.

Nr	Type	Location	Nr of trees	Notes
1.	Horse chestnut	Western area of the park	1	Trunk circumference 540 centimetres (210 in), the widest horse chestnut in Bydgoszcz
2.	Common oak	Western area of the park	2	Trunk circumference 266 centimetres (105 in) (Jakub) and 308 centimetres (121 in) (Ryszard)
3.	Catalpa	At 27 Jagiellońska street, near the Youth Palace	1	Trunk circumference 196 centimetres (77 in)
4.	Magnolia	At 9 Markwarta street	1	Located in a private home garden
5.	Oak	Near Markwarta street. Listed in 2021, named "Alicja".	1	Trunk circumference 340 centimetres (130 in)

== Revitalization ==
In 2017, a decision was made to revitalize the park and meliorate the facility (setting up rainwater collection devices) in a 8 million PLN project.

In 2018, preparation works encompassed the removal of more than 60 trees (mainly maples, honey locusts, black locusts and chestnut trees) which, after the 2017 storms, presented bad conditions or were endangering public safety.

Revitalization scheme started on March 21, 2018. It soon appeared that an immense number of non-exhumed bodies from the ancient Protestant cemetery were still present underground, at an average depth of 90 centimetres (35 in): data estimated that 80 000 tombs were still there. As a consequence, several enhancements planned in the project were put aside, such as the large-scale children recreational area and the rainwater collection tanks. In 2019, the playground was recreated, but with much less elements than initially thought of.

The first stage of the park's revitalization, covering an area of 4.1 ha (excluding tennis courts), was completed at the end of October 2019. Due to the fact that the Witosa Park will be a place of rest and reflection, the concert shell will not be reconstructed there. On the other hand, the large circular fountain, dismantled in March 2021, will be recreated in the future, after a competition to be launched soon, together with the second stage of the revitalization programme.

== Gallery ==
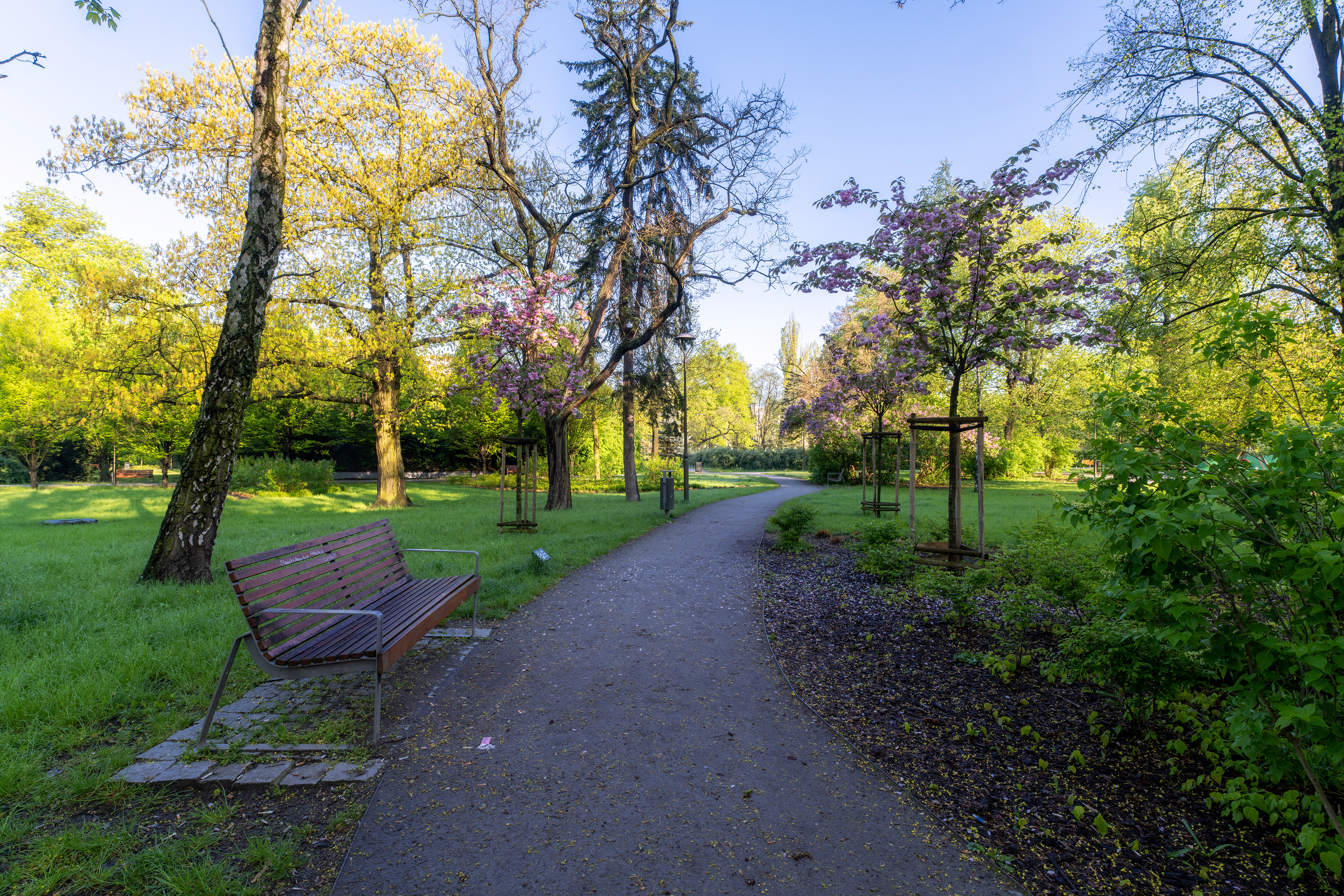
View of a walkway

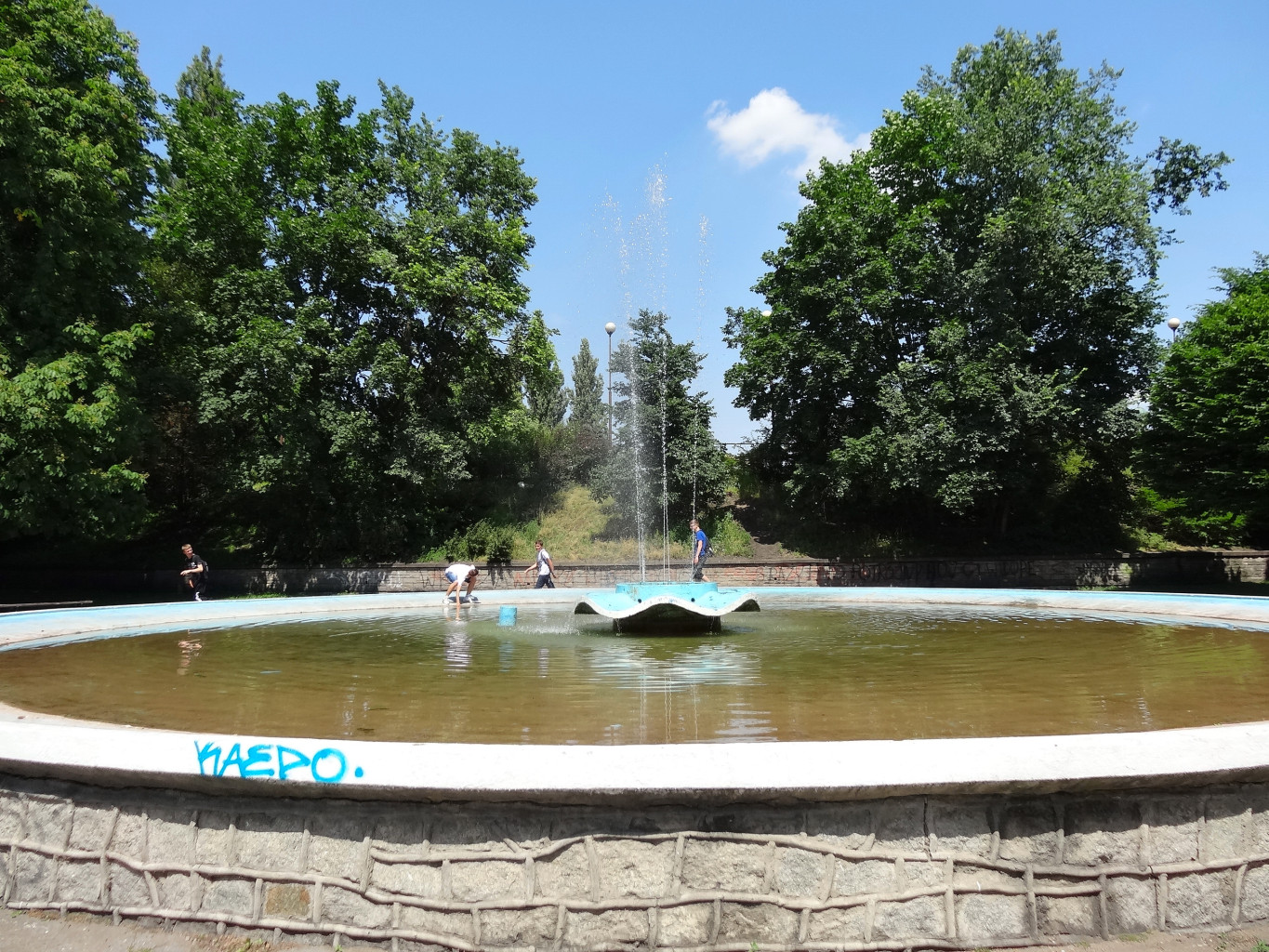
The fountain razed in 2021

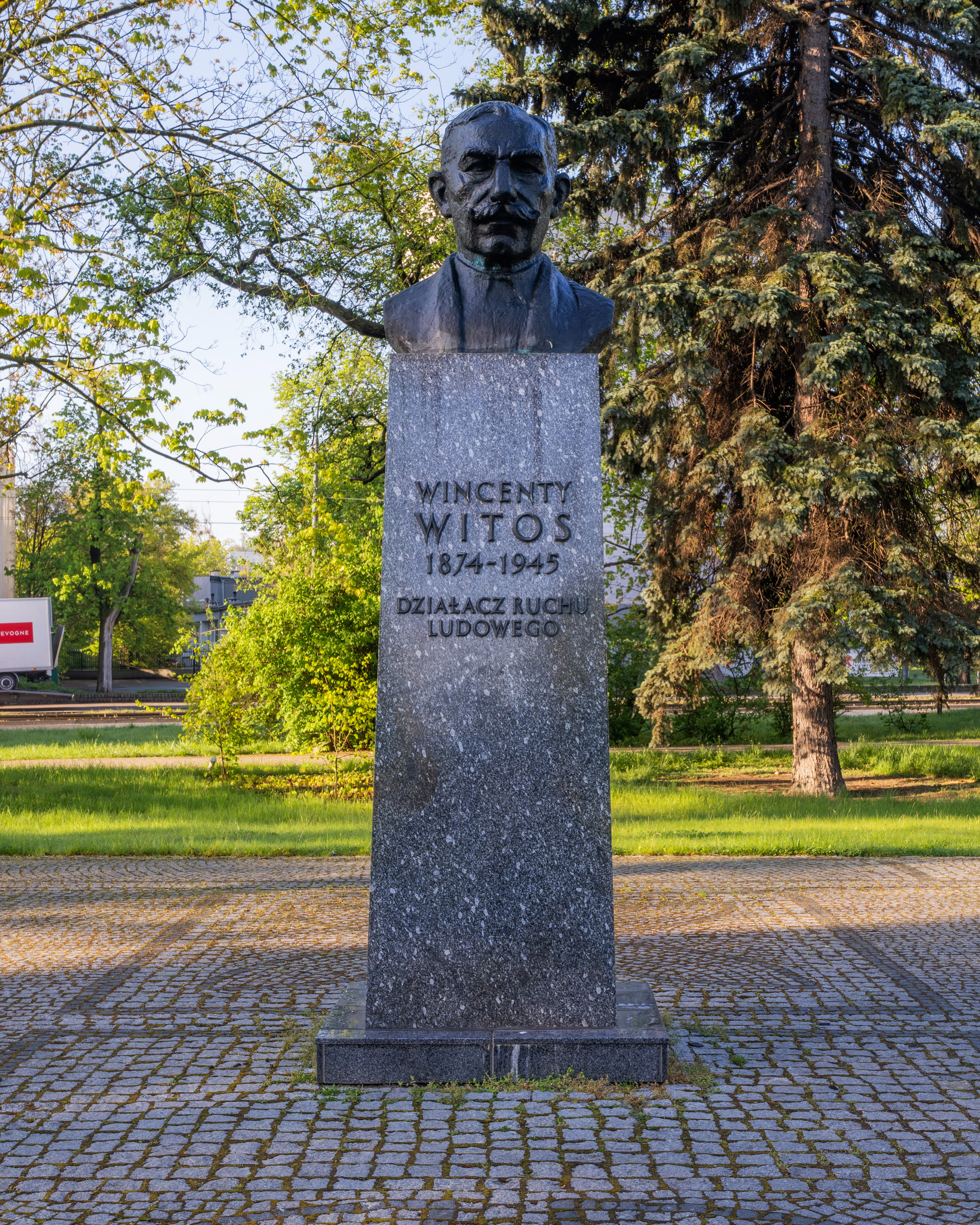
Monument to Wincenty Witos

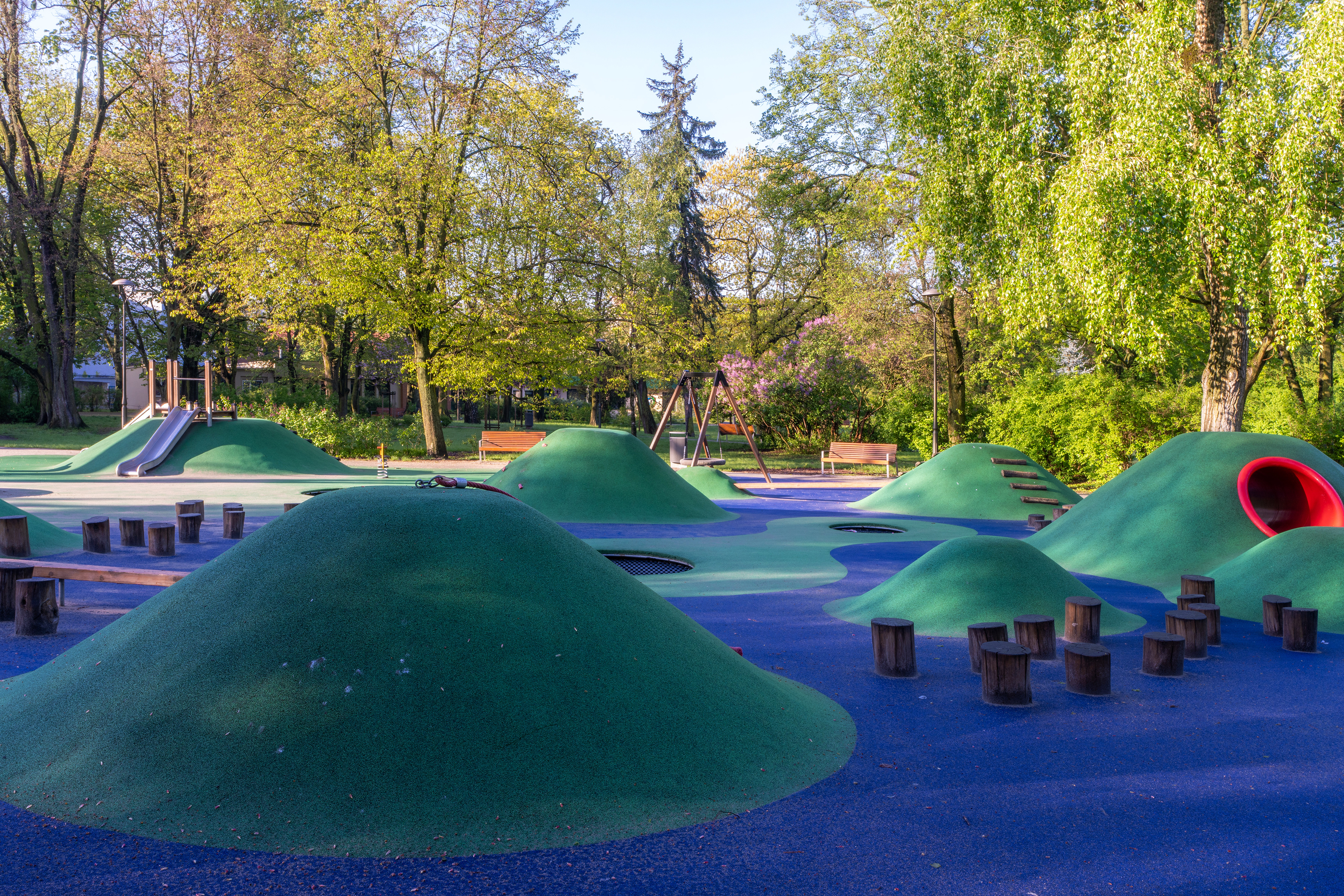
Playground

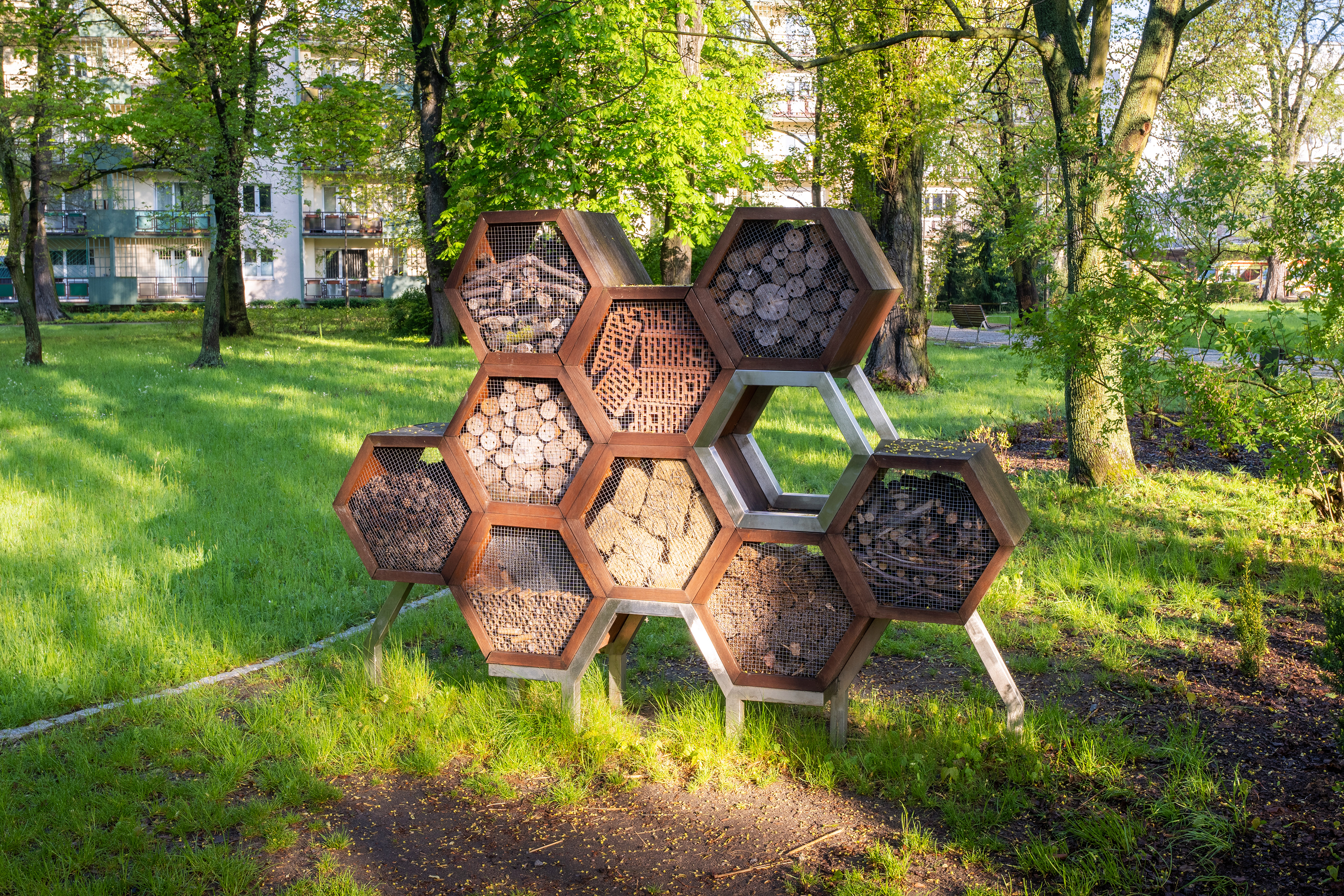
Insect hotel

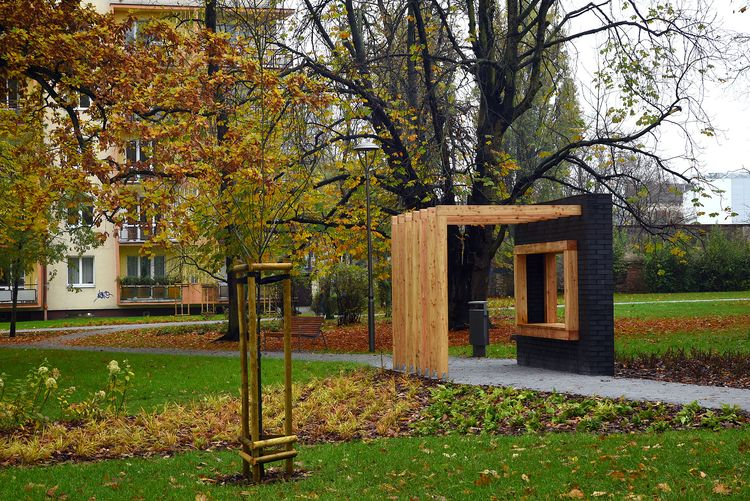
Urban furniture in the park after renovation

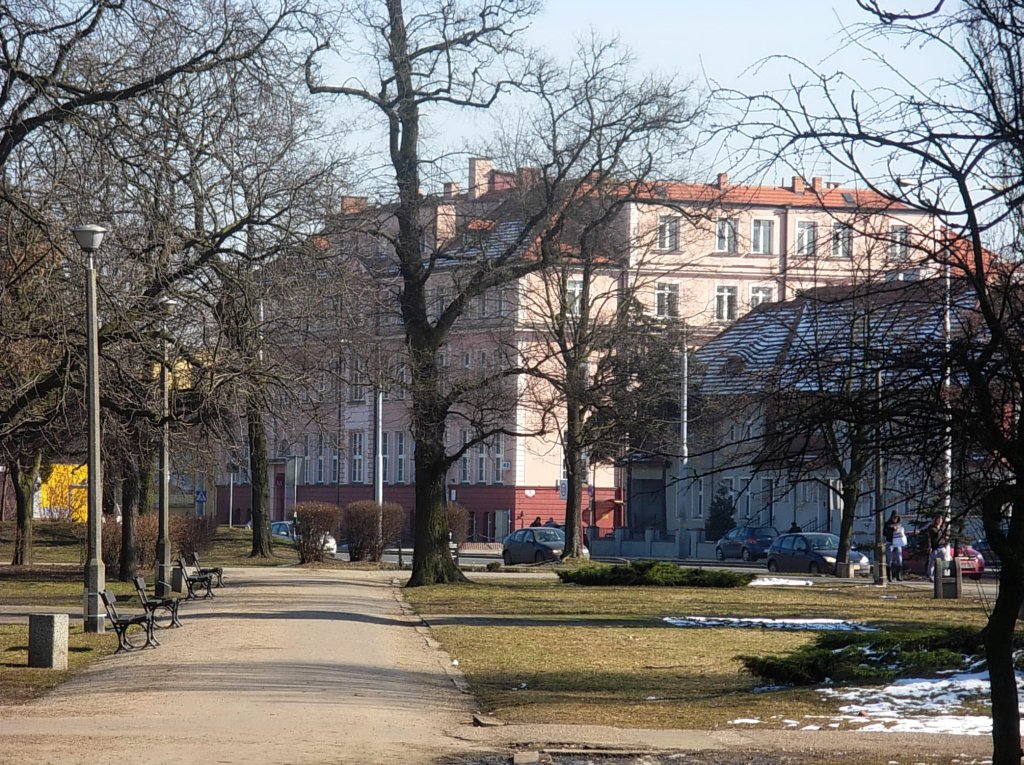
View from the park of the Gasworks building in Jagiellońska street

== See also ==
- Bydgoszcz
- Wincenty Witos
- Nowofarny Cemetery in Bydgoszcz
- Jagiellońska street in Bydgoszcz
- Maksymiliana Piotrowskiego Street in Bydgoszcz
- Markwarta street in Bydgoszcz

== Bibliography ==
- (in Polish) Kuczma, Rajmund (1995). Zieleń w dawnej Bydgoszczy. Bydgoszcz: Instytut Wydawniczy „Świadectwo”.
- (in Polish) Gliwiński, Eugeniusz (1996). Kontrowersje wokół nazwy parku im. W. Witosa. Kalendarz Bydgoski. Bydgoszcz: Towarzystwo Miłośników Miasta Bydgoszczy.
- (in Polish) Pastuszewski, Stefan (1996). Bydgoska Gospodarka Komunalna. Bydgoszcz: Instytut Wydawniczy „Świadectwo”. ISBN 8385860371.
- (in Polish) Kaja, R. (1995). Bydgoskie pomniki przyrody. Bydgoszcz: Instytut Wydawniczy „Świadectwo”. ISBN 8385860320.
- (in Polish) Umiński, Janusz (1996). Bydgoszcz. Przewodnik. Bydgoszcz: Regionalny Oddział PTTK „Szlak Brdy”.
