= Main Post Office, Bydgoszcz =

Main Post Office
- Polish: Poczta Główna
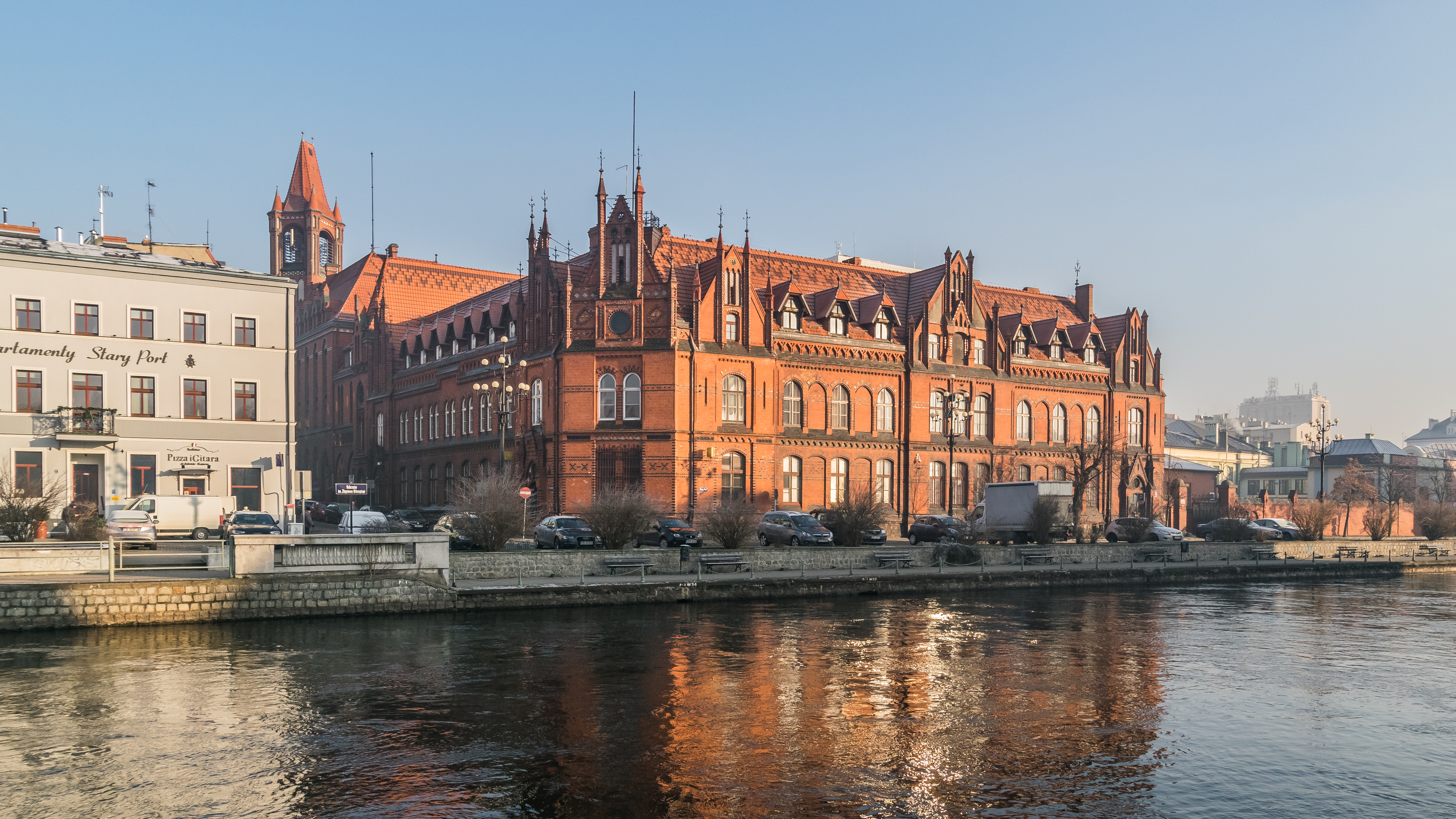
- Building from the Brda river
- Interactive map of the Main Post Office area

General information
- Type: Post office
- Architectural style: Neo-Gothic
- Classification: Nr.601347-Reg.A/749 (December 15, 1971)
- Location: Jagiellońska Street 6, Bydgoszcz, Poland
- Coordinates: 53°7′24″N 18°00′12″E
- Completed: 1883
- Renovated: 1899
- Client: Poczta Polska

Technical details
- Material: brick
- Floor count: 4

Design and construction
- Architects: Boettger, Kleinfeldt, Neumann

Website
- Bydgoszcz-poczta-glowna

The Main Post Office is a complex of historical post buildings in Bydgoszcz, Poland. It is owned by the Polish Post. Buildings have been registered on the Kuyavian-Pomeranian Voivodeship Heritage List.

== Location ==
Buildings stand on a plot delimitated by the following streets: Jagiellońska, Stary Port, Pocztowa and Franciszek Ksawery Drucki-Lubecki in Bydgoszcz. They have been erected on the northern bank of the Brda river.

== History ==
=== Ancient period ===
The existence of royal mail institutions royal in Bydgoszcz dates back to the first half of 18th century, as confirmed by postal statutes of the Crown General Post in 1733, 1754 and 1766. In 1751, the post office in Bydgoszcz was in a bourgeois building on the corner of Niedźwiedzia and Stefan Batory Streets near the Old Marketplace.

After the First Partition of Poland, the post office moved to a building in current Długa street. The Bydgoszcz mail office has been planned to migrate from the streets adjacent to the Old Market to the other side of the Brda river, on a land belonging primarily to the military, where a complex of barracks and royal stables, have been built in September 1773. The casern was billeting the city-stationed squadron of the 7th Hussars regiment led by General Paweł Józef Małachowski. Initially a massive one-storey building, it was later on expanded with further floors and a number of other buildings associated with needs of the army (barracks, stables, coach house). Since the end of the 18th century, a mail office has been standing in the complex.

==== First post office building ====
In 1815 Prussian authorities assigned the former stables to the needs of Royal Prussian Post Office Directorate in Bydgoszcz. The new post office was then located in the corner of the streets Jagiellońska and Franciszek Ksawery Drucki-Lubecki. The ensemble had not yet a representative character, but it was sufficient for the needs of the mail Directorate. The former stables of the 7th Hussars regiment, unused, were demolished in 1896.

Gottfried Groschke, longtime director (1815-1847), had been designated in 1840 "Honorary Citizen of Bromberg: under his rule, post office staff doubled, and in the mid-19th century postal stations in the district were supported by 145 postillions looking after more than 400 horses, regular connections (by stagecoach and postal vans) linking Bromberg with, among others, Toruń, Gdańsk, Poznań, Inowrocław, Berlin and Königsberg.

==== Second post office building ====
Upon the establishment of a Higher Directorate of Post in Bydgoszcz, the initial edifice on Jagiellońska Street could no longer fully meet the needs of a new, enlarged administration coordinating the mail work in the city and throughout the Bydgoszcz region: there was a real need to get a building that could manage both activities, mail and telegraphy. By the end of the 1850s, on-site stables and coach houses were built according to the design of building inspector Bannenschmidt. The construction standing in the corner of Jagiellońska and Pocztowa streets displayed Neoclassical features.

In 1859, the post office also housed the activities of the Municipal Central Tax Office (German: Hauptsteueramt). The new post office building consisted of two wings: a massive body on Jagiellońska Street and lower wing along Pocztowa street. The ensemble, only seat of Bydgoszcz mail, was demolished in 1896.

==== Third post office building ====
After 1871's victory during Franco-Prussian War and the improved financial condition of Kingdom of Prussia, Prussian authorities decided to expand the mail institution network across the country. In this context, it has been planned to erect a new building designed for offices, mail and telegraph on a plot along the Brda river, still property of the military administration: in 1870s, an old guardhouse had been liquidated, but other buildings were still standing, like a residential and wattle and daub fire station.

In 1879, the area was purchased to construct the new post edifice, which was unveiled on September 1, 1885. Plans and drawings were the work of several authors, including Mr Boettger, government building master. The architectural design was dictated by Prussian parliament rules, such as Neo-Gothic bricks, considered as a Prussian national style, the use of rooms and courtyards, the height of premises fences over 4 m, etc.

Clinker bricks for the construction have been brought from Malbork's Brick and Ceramic Factory. On the first floor were the telegraph machinery, the telephone room and the battery storage. The wing along the Brda river were dedicated for housing allowances for postal workers. The main entrance to the courtyard stood on river side and its ornated gate survived preserved till today.

==== Fourth post office building ====
After 10 years of activity of the post office building, a need appears for a new one dedicated entirely to the Imperial Directorate of Posts, with its constantly expanding amount of offices works (mail, telegraph and phone), and a multitude of civil servants. Another plot was acquired, with land and buildings between Jagiellońska and Franciszek Ksawery Drucki-Lubecki streets, belonging to the Customs Office. After demolition of an old classicist building standing there, the construction of the new edifice started in 1896, according to the design of a team of architects led by Kleinfeldt and L. Neumann from Königsberg.

Building progress was overseen by inspector Wolff, on behalf of postal officials Döhring and Schwerkotting. The building was completed in 1900, the masonry work has been mainly led by Bydgoszcz master bricklayer Paul Bohm from Bydgoszcz, and the joinery by A. Busse from Eberswalde. The building is realized in the Neo-Gothic style, referring to the office building of Post and Telegraph facing Brda riverside. The premises were thus contained between four streets: Jagiellońska, Stary Port, Pocztowa and Franciszek Ksawery Drucki-Lubecki, the fourth side facing the Brda river.

The postal building ensemble has survived in its 1899 initial shape almost unchanged to this day with its original windows and doors, its massive frame structures in the hallways, the cross vaulted corridors and staircases, the original metal railings and some ceramic floors. Only interior spaces have been transformed to fit a modern and functional activity. The building continues to serve as the Main Post Office of Bydgoszcz.

== Architecture ==
Main Post Office buildings complex is built in the so-called "Prussian national style", which was in force in the last decades of the 19th century, and required for every new official buildings in the German Empire. It alludes to the Northern German Neo-Gothic style, which, however, also refers to other styles such as Italian and German Neo-Renaissance, Neo-Romanesque, Round-arch style -invoking the Romanesque and Byzantine architecture- and Spitzbogenstil -with scrolling Dutch and Gothic elements.

=== Old building (Stary Port Street Wing) ===
The building is brick-made, with one storey, an attic and a basement. It has two wings with slight avant-corps: one is parallel to the river, the other one covers half the length of Pocztowa street. The pentagonal tower in the courtyard shelters a staircase. The bare briked facades are, in places, supplemented with greenish or maroon glazed ones, displaying a more decorative nature. Glazed details draw attention to the regular friezes, pinnacles, traceries on the one hand and the geometric pattern thread embedded in the wall on the other hand.The richness of ceramics detail, wrought iron decorative elements are also remarkable.

The facades on the riverside present biforium and triforium windows. Acute overhead arch windows are decorated with an alternating arrangement of red and glazed bricks. Horizontal divisions are set by a brick cornice cordons. On Pocztowa street, massive triforium windows are used on the ground floor and biforium ones on the first floor. Corner decorative portal topped with triangular pinnacle gables display a clock on both sides of which are placed original ceramic coats of arms (with mail and telegraph symbols). The roof exposes finial and densely ornate dormers made up of profiled planks.

The view of the rear façade is alike the front but in a more simplified and devoid of color friezes or glazed details. The passage of time, acts of war and inappropriate reconstruction work resulted in the loss of part of the decoration on the facades of the building. In the corner is preserved a surviving metal frame structure where was mounted the cable network of telegraph and telephone, topped with an ornate flèche from the date of construction of the facility "1885".

=== New building (Jagiellońska street Wing) ===
This building has a "U" shape with a massive body giving onto Jagiellońska Street, and a high tower in the north-western corner. This younger edifice is bigger and taller than the building on the riverside. The transition from the old to the new happens at half the length of Pocztowa street.

The construction has three-storey, with an attic and a basement. Prominent avant-corps are noticeable from Jagiellońska Street, lowerones are present on Pocztowa's facade. The ensemble is covered by a gable roof with embedded dormers. The decoration of the facade is simplified in comparaison with the older building, but the same decorative repertoire is partly repeated. It uses wimpergs, pinnacles, pointed arches, arched windows and portals, along with a diverse combination of brick traceries, iron rose window and color friezes with rhythmically repetitive arrangements of red and green glazed bricks.

Buildings have been registered on the Kuyavian-Pomeranian Voivodeship Heritage List as No. 601347 Reg.A/749, on December 15, 1971.

== Gallery ==
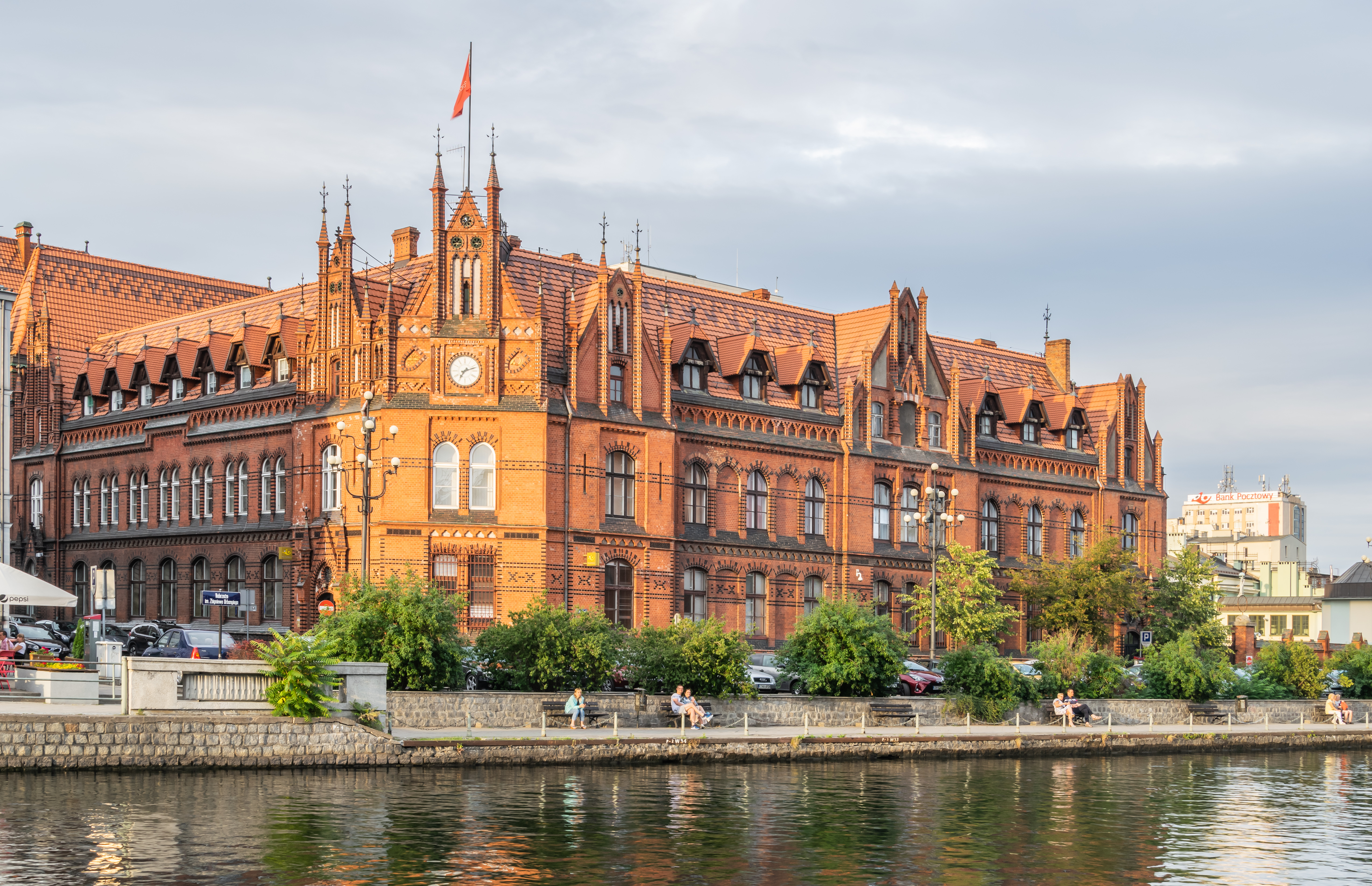
View from the river

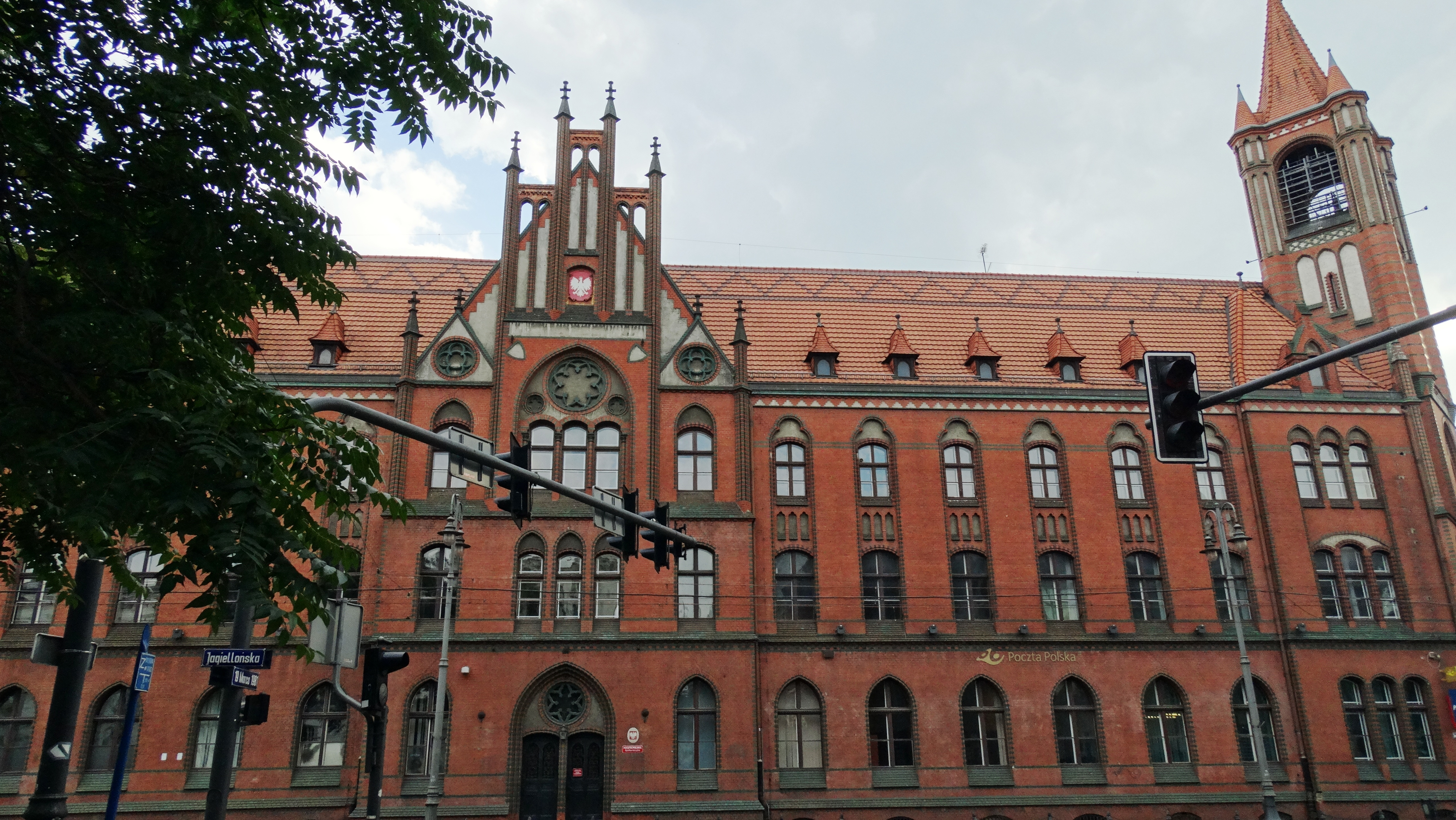
Facade onto Jagiellońska St.

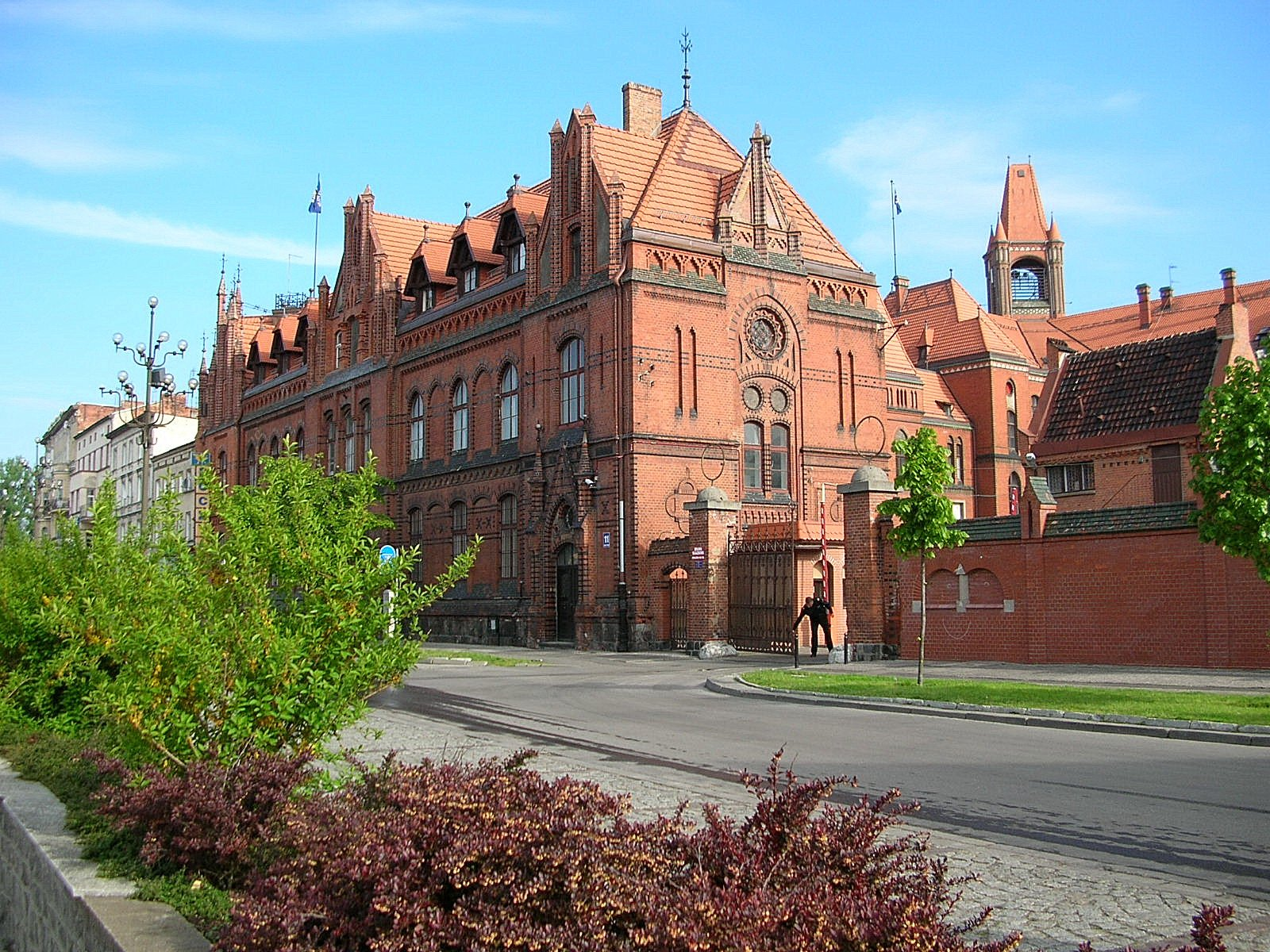
View from the river bank

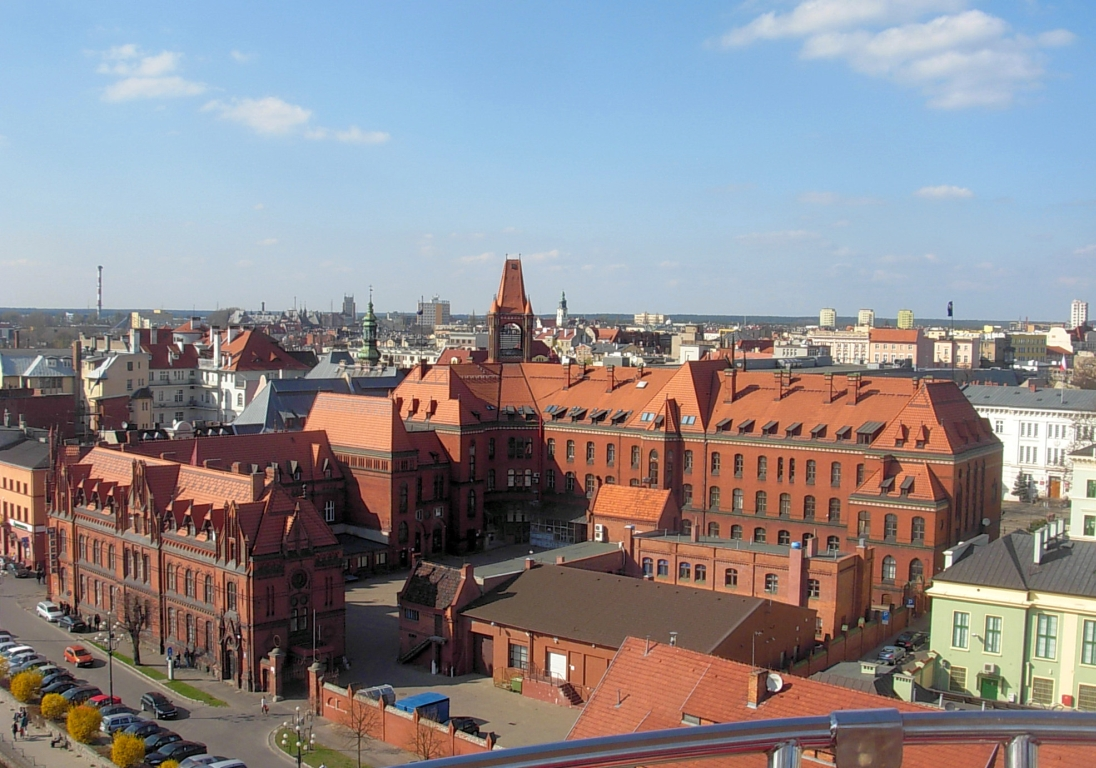
Bird eye view

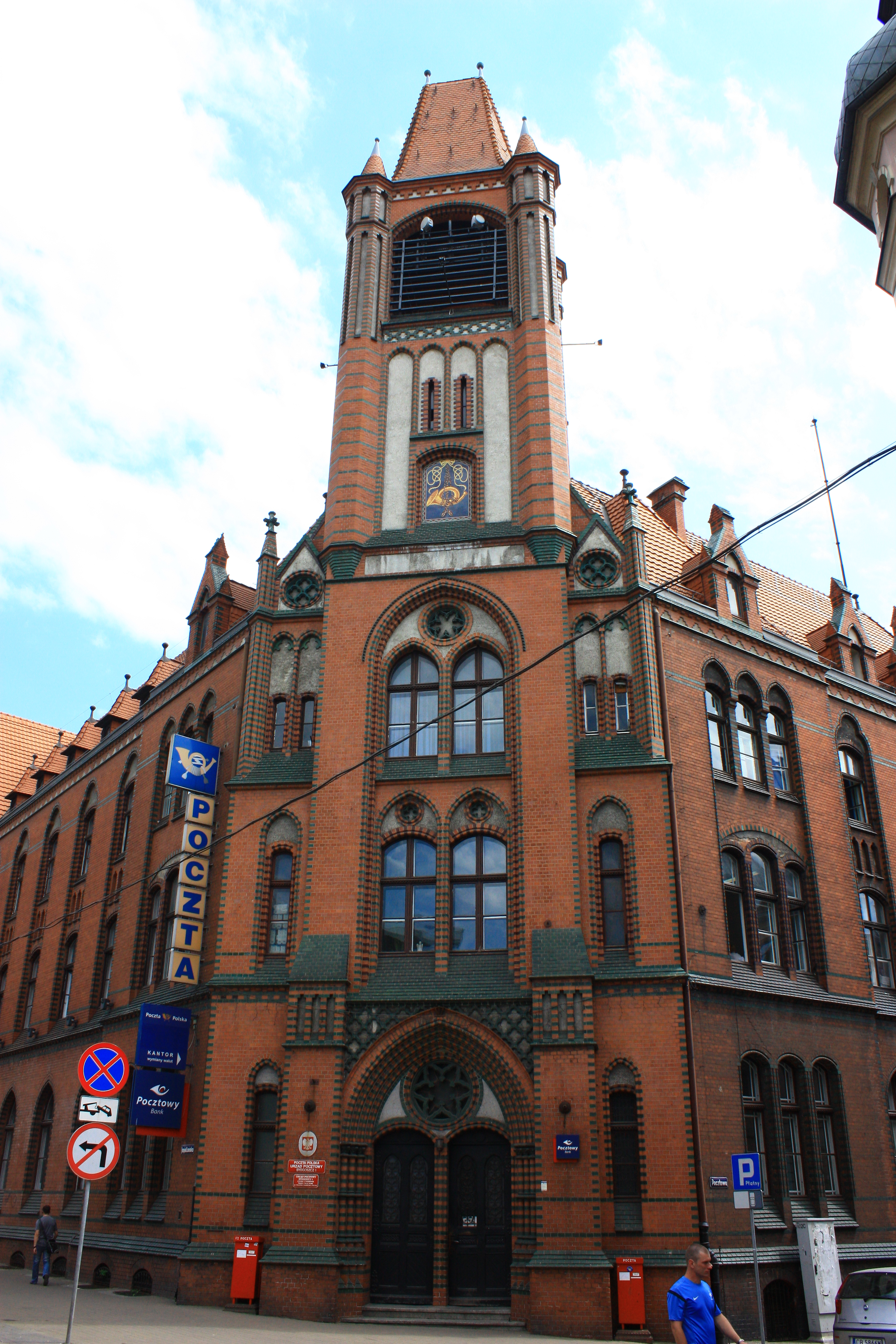
Tower on Jagiellońska st.

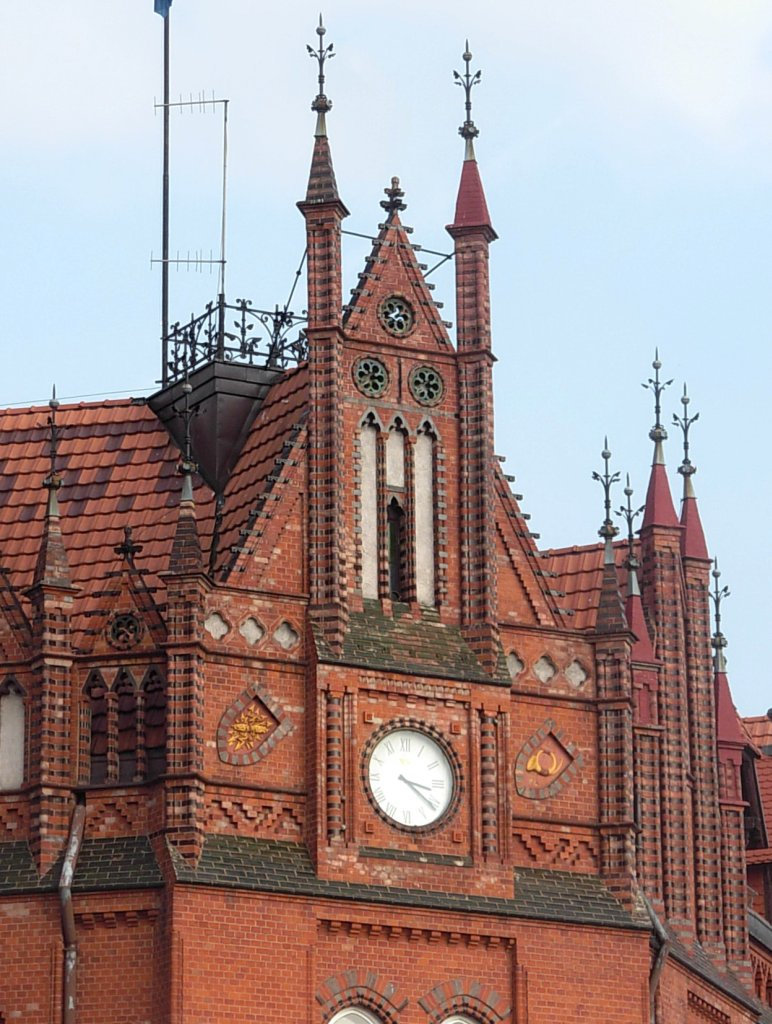
Gable roof on the old building

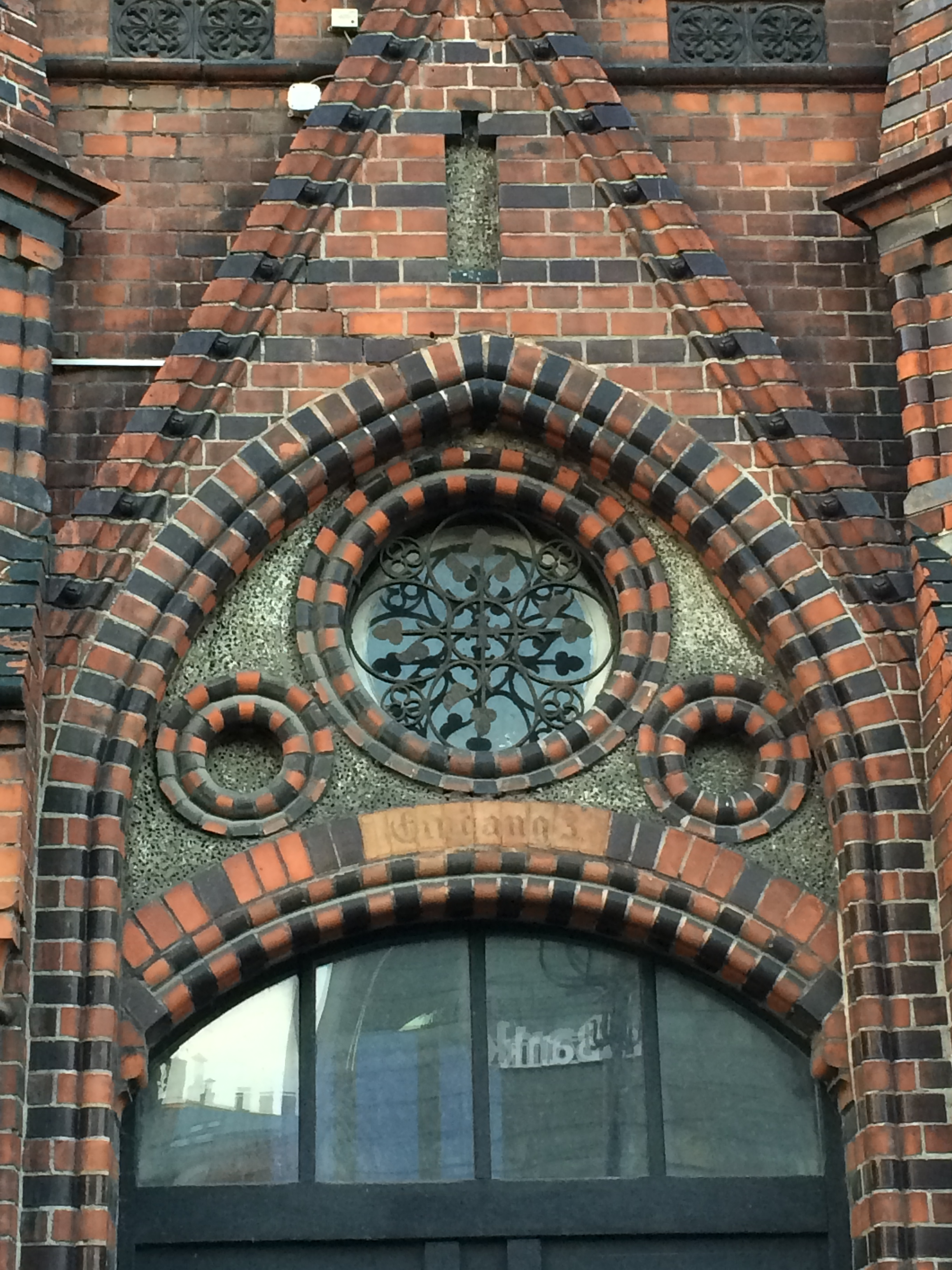
Detail on the arched portal (notice the inscription "Eingang 3")

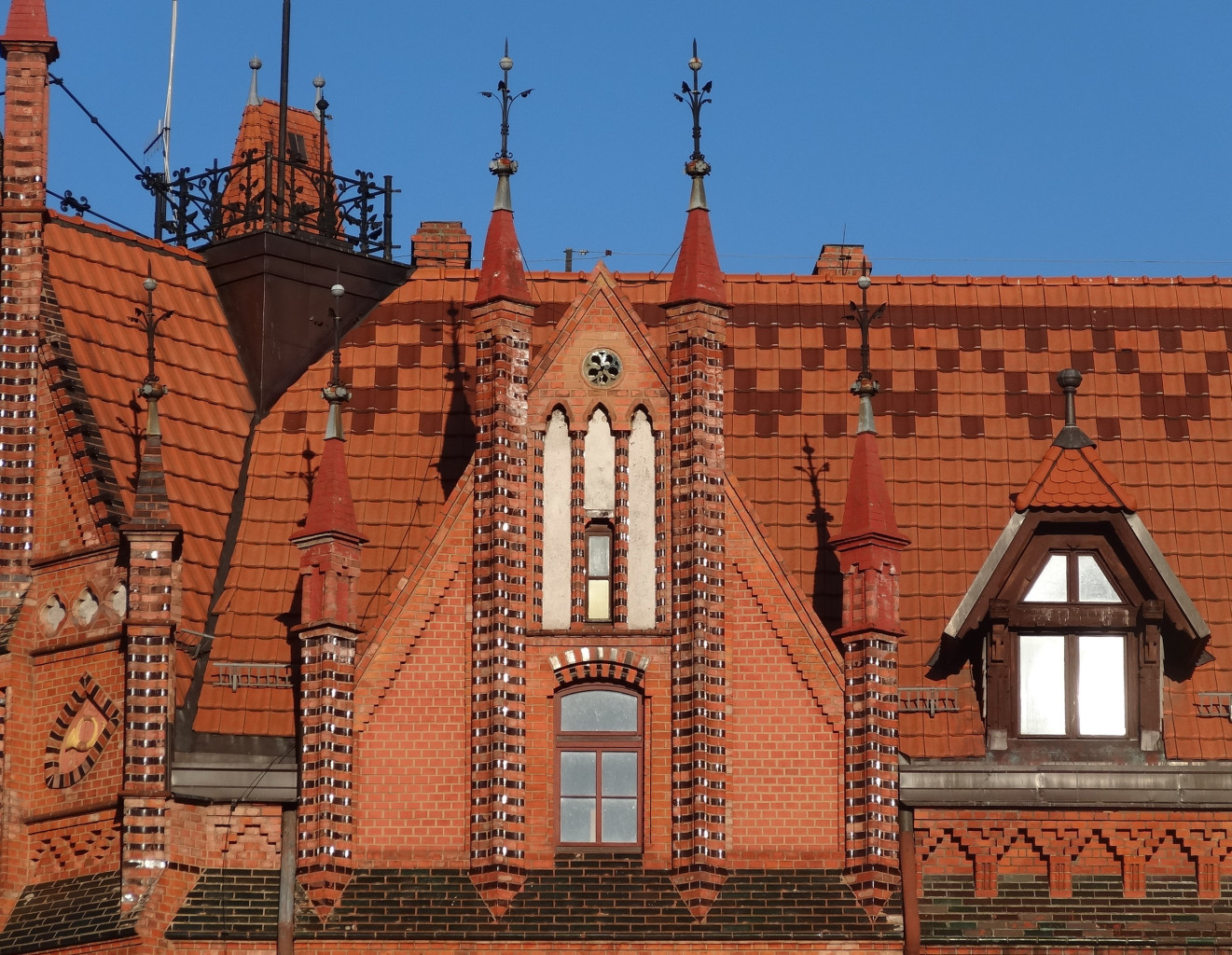
Detail of adorned roofs

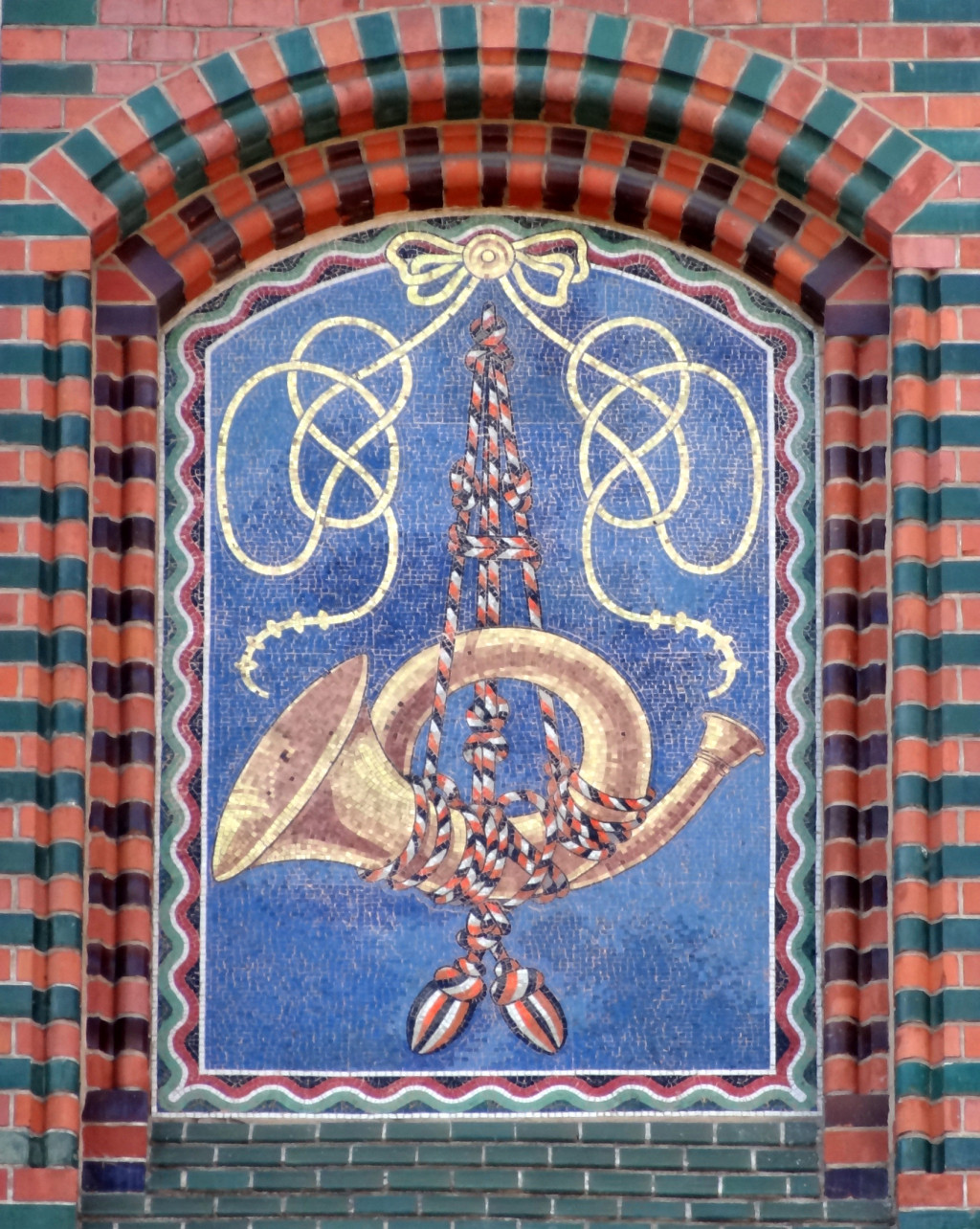
Glazed mosaic

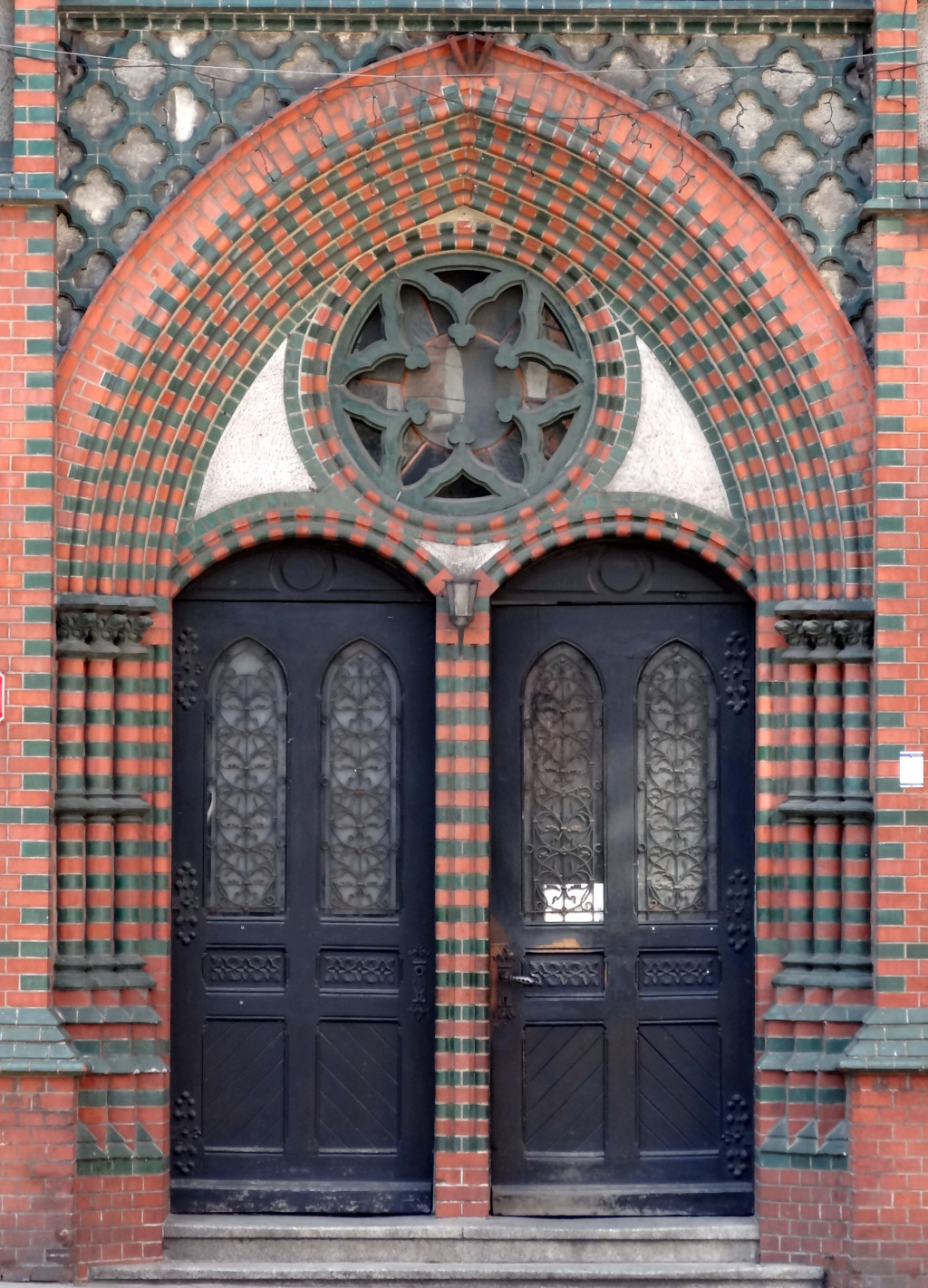
Portal

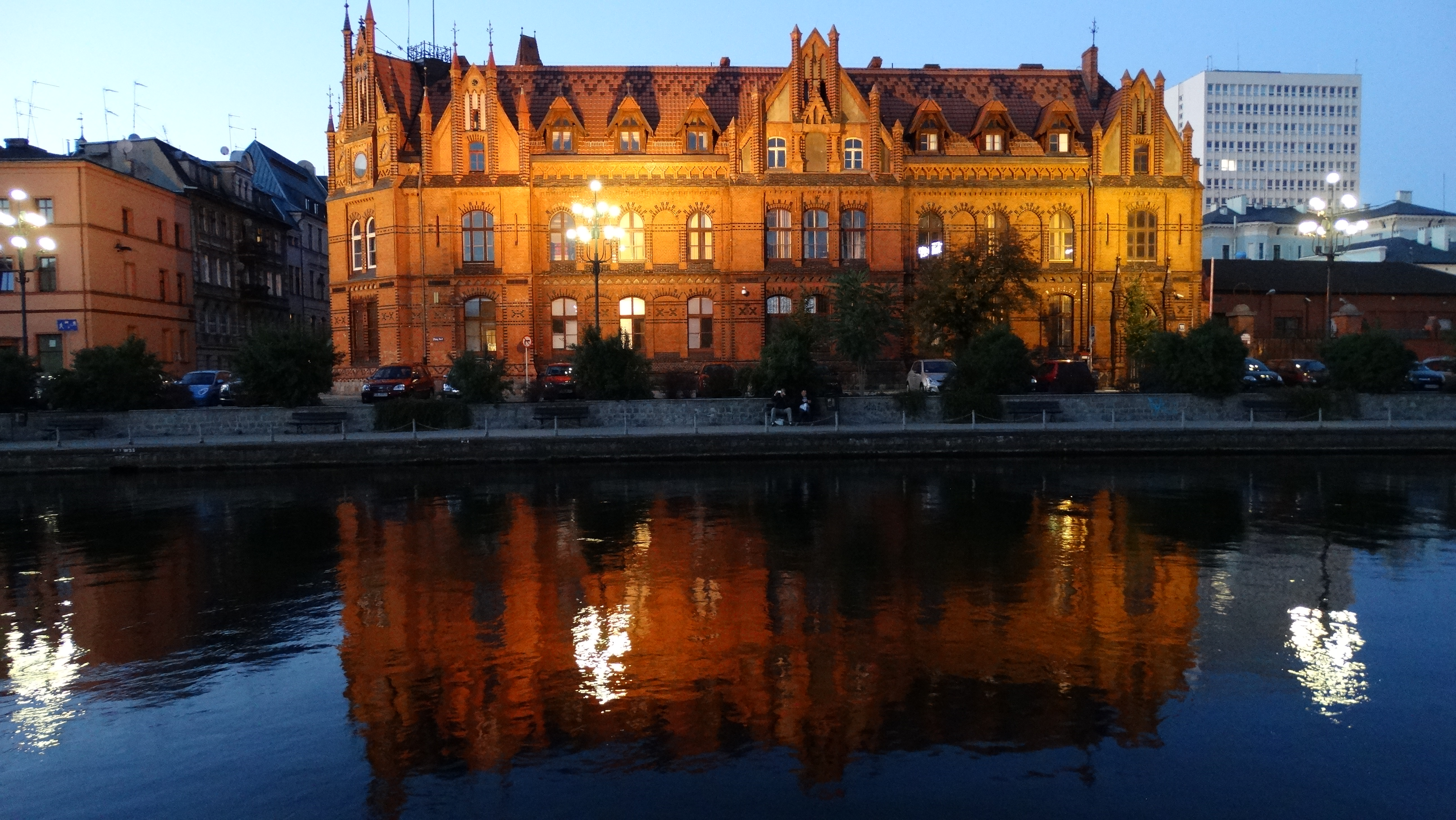
By night

== Bibliography ==
- (in Polish) Umiński, Janusz (1996). Bydgoszcz. Przewodnik. Bydgoszcz: Regionalny Oddział PTTK "Szlak Brdy".
- (in Polish) Winter, Piotr (1997). Dawne bydgoskie budynki pocztowe i z pocztą związane. Materiały do Dziejów Kultury i Sztuki Bydgoszczy i Regionu, zeszyt 2. Bydgoszcz: Pracownia Dokumentacji i Popularyzacji Zabytków Wojewódzkiego Ośrodka Kultury w Bydgoszczy.
