= Jerzy Rupniewski =

Polish painter (1888–1950)

Jerzy Mieczysław Rupniewski
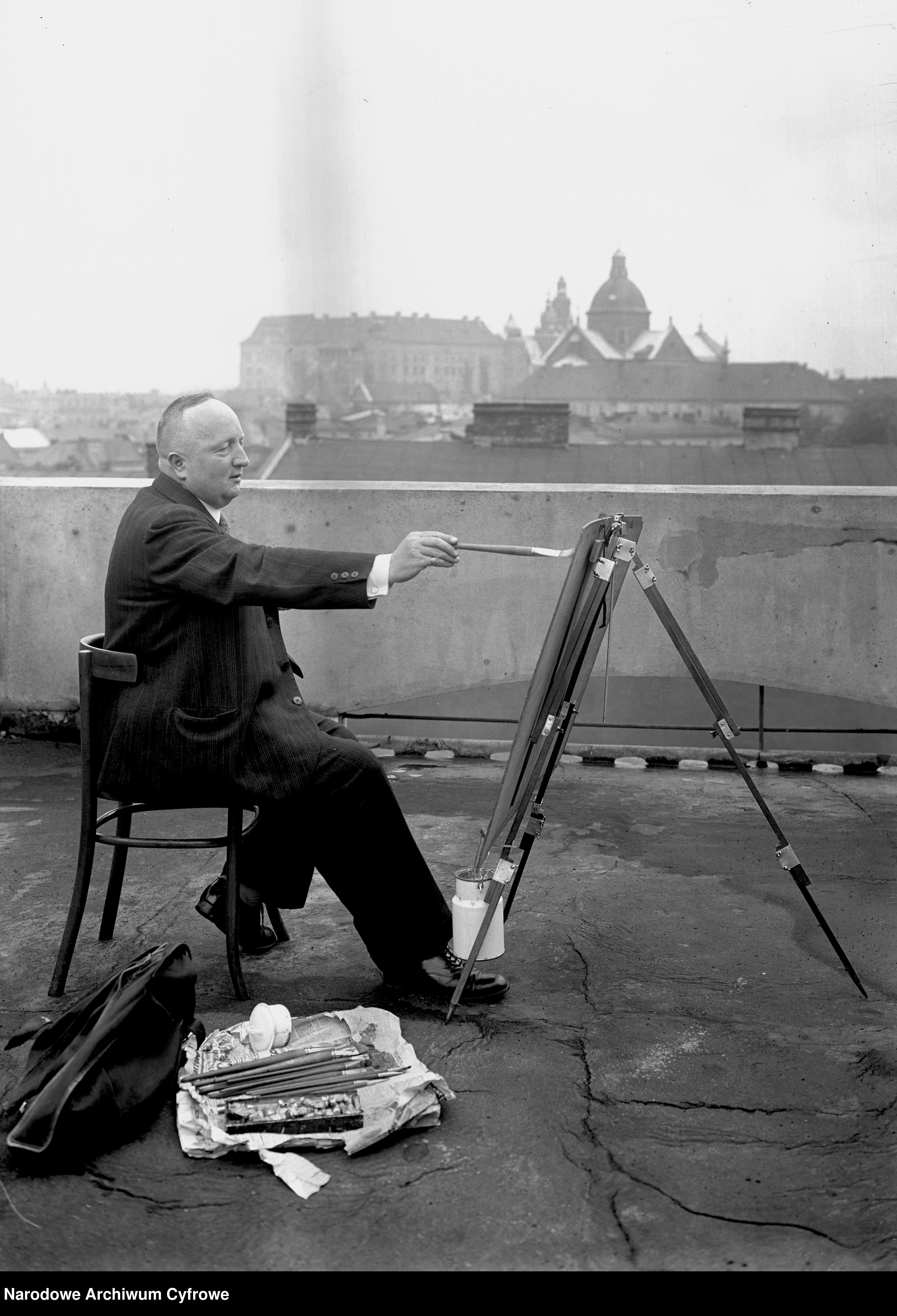
- Jerzy Rupniewski painting Kraków in 1938
- Born: 21 September 1888; Warsaw, Congress Poland
- Died: 10 June 1950 (aged 61); Świecie, Poland
- Occupation: Painter

Jerzy Mieczysław Rupniewski (21 September 1888 – 10 June 1950) was a Polish painter and graphic artist.

== Biography ==
=== Early life and youth ===
Jerzy was the son of Władysław Rupniewski and Maria née Janke.

He studied at the vocational institution of The Trade School of the Merchants' Assembly of the City of Warsaw (Polish: Szkoła Handlowa Zgromadzenia Kupców m. Warszawy), located in Prosta street (now inexistent). He started to paint at the age of 15, but his father pushed him to study in the commercial domain. Hence, young Rupniewski moved to Lausanne, Switzerland to study at the Ecole des Hautes Etudes Commerciales (English: Higher School of Commerce). He graduated from the establishment in 1908.

In 1912, he studied painting for a short period at the School of Fine Arts in Warsaw (Szkoła Sztuk Pięknych w Warszawie), studying under the supervision of Konrad Krzyżanowski, Stanisław Lentz, Wincenty Trojanowski and Xawery Dunikowski. Then he turned to study sculpture at the Kunstgewerbeschule of Munich.

Afterwards, Jerzy moved to Paris, where he continued his education at the Academie Julian with the portraitist Marcel Baschet and at the Académie de la Grande Chaumière. At the end of the year 1913, he returned to Warsaw.

His first exhibition occurred in 1914 at the Society for the Encouragement of Fine Arts in Warsaw where he displayed pencil drawings as well as oil and watercolor paintings. In 1917, he organized his first solo exhibition.

=== Activity in Bydgoszcz ===
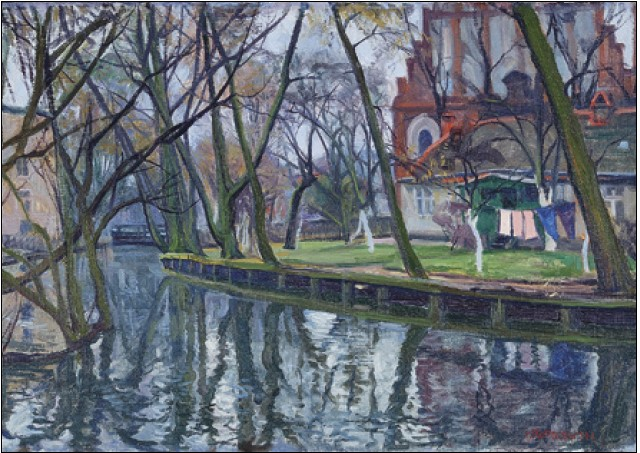
Jerzy Rupniewski: Wenecja Bydgoska (Bydgoszcz Venice, 1926)

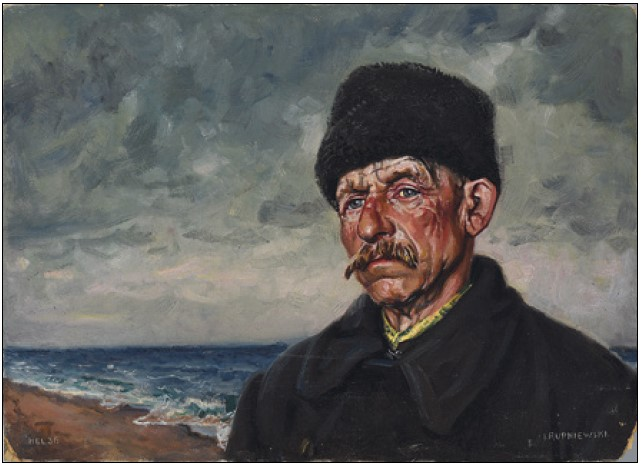
Jerzy Rupniewski: Rybak (Fisherman, 1936)

In early 1920, he transferred to Zalesie, a small village located 19 kilometres (12 mi) north of Bydgoszcz and began to participate in the cultural life of Bydgoszcz.

When a Society for the Encouragement of Fine Arts was established in Bydgoszcz in August 1921, Rupniewski became a member of the board.

In November 1925, the Rupniewski family settled permanently in Bydgoszcz: first at 15 Krakowska Street until 1929, then on Konarskiego Street and eventually from 1934 at 151 Nakielska Street.

In October 1929, the Association of Artists in Bydgoszcz was created, Rupniewski was its vice-president and Karol Mondral its president. From 1930 he was a member of the Commission Board of the City Municipal Museum. He regularly and voluntarily donated paintings for charity purposes.

As the president of the Association of Pomeranian Artists, Jerzy was a member of the Committee for the construction of a Monument to Marshal Piłsudski in the city, created in 1935.

In Bydgoszcz, he painted views of the town, especially the so-called Bydgoszcz Venice ''Wenecja Bydgoska'', an architectural ensemble of houses in downtown built over one of the rivulets. He depicted this area many times with various details. Furthermore, he depicted as well local fishermen, workers, craftsmen and salesmen. He was a member of the Julian Fałat Artists' Brotherhood in Toruń. From November 1929 to 1931, Jerzy was the vice-president and then president of the Pomeranian Artists' Association.

Rupniewski traveled extensively in search of new themes, visiting:

- Italy in 1926 (Venice, Naples, Capri, Trieste)
- Yugoslavia in 1931 (Korčula, Sarajevo, Dubrovnik);
- France in 1934 (Paris);
- Switzerland (Lausanne);
- Germany in 1939 (Nuremberg, Essen).

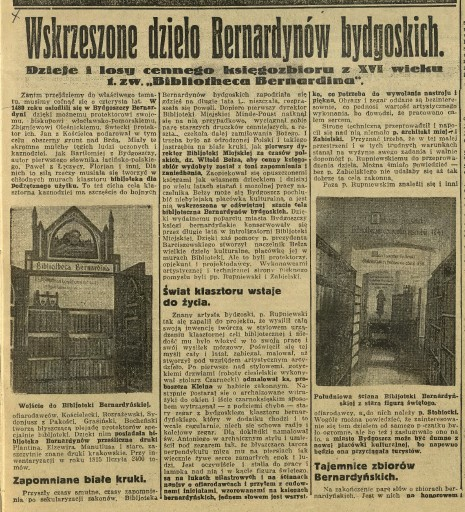
Article in the Dziennik Bydgoski 1936 on the interiors re-desig by Rupniewski

Though most of these foreign trips have been supposedly financed by selling his wife's valuables, who came from a wealthy landowning family.

In Bydgoszcz, he exhibited at the Municipal Museum and at the Bydgoszcz Salon on Old Market Square, which was razed during World War II.

Several extensive reviews published in the "Dziennik Bydgoski" for the opening of one of his exhibition in 1935 proved the popularity that the painter's art enjoyed in the city.

The same year In 1935, Rupniewski undertook the design of rooms in the Municipal Library in Bydgoszcz, intended to store the Bernardine book collection. The artist designed the interiors together with Wiktor Zabielski, the city architect. He independently created the wall painting, which consisted of portraits of monks and stylized inscriptions commemorating the donors of the books. For this work, the city of Bydgoszcz donated the artist a studio in the building of the Municipal Library.

=== Second World War and following years ===
After the outbreak of the war in 1939, Rupniewski and his wife left to Lviv where he continued painting for a living and then to Janowice near Sandomierz. His deteriorating health and paralysis resulted in six months of treatment in a Warsaw hospital.

He and his wife escaped deportation, staying in Pruszków, Jędrzejów and Zakopane.

When the Rupniewski's left Bydgoszcz, the paintings from the studio were kept in the City Museum. In 1943, part of it was transported to Dębów (around 130 works) where it was lost in 1945 during war operations. Another part was stored in Kawęcin and Trzciniec, where it was also destroyed.

After the war, he returned to Bydgoszcz and joined the Association of Polish Artists and Designers. He received the award of the Bydgoszcz Voivodeship National Council and the Medal of the 600th anniversary of the city of Bydgoszcz in May 1946, during the exhibition organised by the Pomeranian branch of the Association of Polish Artists.

In spring 1947, Jerrzy was taken to the State hospital for the mentally and nervously ill in Świecie. He died there on 10 June 1950. He was buried in the parish cemetery of the Church of the Divine Mercy in Bydgoszcz.

== Works ==
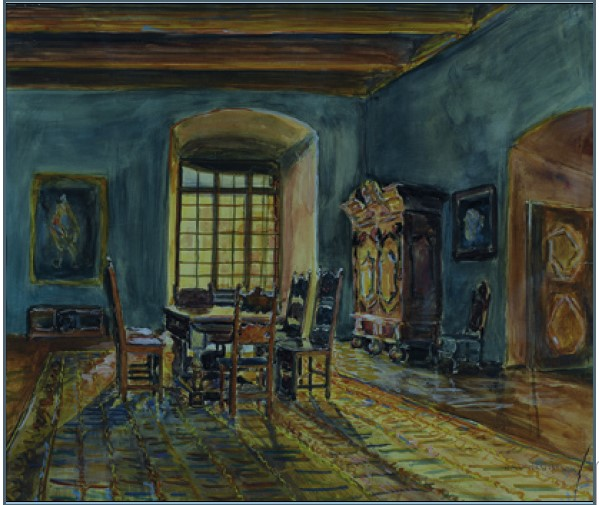
Jerzy Rupniewski: Wawel (c. 1923)

Jerzy Rupniewski's favorite subjects were city views, old houses and streets. He frequently painted portraits of local residents. Eventually, he pictured representative and intimate interiors. Marian Turwid nicknamed dubbed him in an article the "Bydgoszcz Canaletto", for his love of painting the daily life of the city and its people.

Tadeusz Dobrowolski, Polish art historian, wrote in 1926: "Rupniewski, a skillful watercolorist, also creates realistically, sometimes introducing into play an impressionist vision; the faithfulness of the depiction of the painted object is harmoniously associated with the impressionist assumption(...)".

=== Selective list of creations ===
Based on the set of preserved works and those mentioned in sources (exhibitions lists), it is assessed that Jerzy Rupniewski realized over 400 paintings.

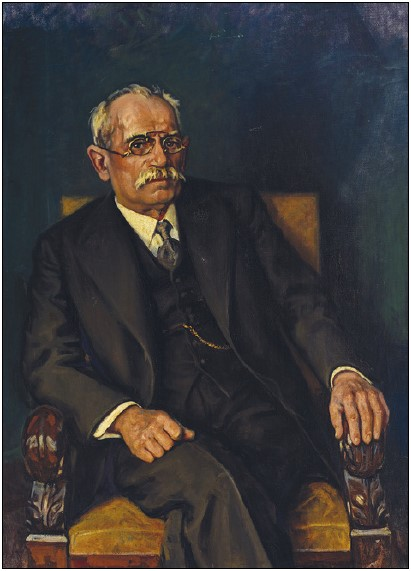
Jerzy Rupniewski: Portret dr. Jana Biziela (Portrait of dr. Jan Biziel, 1933)

- Chłopiec w czapce (Boy in a Cap) - 1911;
- Views of Parisian streets (Boulevard St. Germain, Rue de l'Abbaye, Rue Visconti, Palais de Bagatelle) - 1914;
- Stare Miasto w Warszawie (Old Town in Warsaw) - 1921;
- Kościół Klarysek and Wenecja Bydgoska (Church of the Poor Clares and Bydgoszcz Venice) - 1922, first views from Bydgoszcz. Several dozen paintings with Bydgoszcz themes were listed in catalogues and exhibition reviews.
- Pałac w Łazienkach (Łazienki Palace) - 1924;
- Motyw z Wenecji V (Theme from Venice) - 1927;
- Wjazd wojsk polskich do Bydgoszczy w 1920 roku (Entry of Polish troops into Bydgoszcz in 1920) - 1927;
- Wenecja Bydgoska zimą (Bydgoszcz Venice in winter) - 1928;
- Chata na Helu (Cottage in Hel) - 1929;
- Portret dr. Jana Biziela (Portrait of Jan Biziel) - 1933;
- Notre Dame w Paryżu (Notre-Dame de Paris) - 1934;
- Portret Heleny Surynowej (Portrait of Helena Surynowa) - 1935-1937;
- Wnętrze pracowni artysty (Interiors of the artist's studio) - 1936;
- Rybak (Fisherman) - 1937;
- Wnętrze Biblioteki bernardyńskiej (Interior of the Bernardine Library) - 1937;
- Marynarz na straży (Sailor on Guard) - 1938.

The Bydgoszcz Municipal Museum houses a collection of 47 paintings, created between 1911 and 1946. They include portraits (14 items), views of Bydgoszcz (10) and maritime views.

Some Polish museums include individual paintings by the artist: the National Museum in Warsaw, Museums in Toruń, Poznań, Szczecin, Gdańsk and Bielsko-Biała.

Abroad, Rupniewski's works can be seen in the State Picture Gallery in Lviv, the Tretyakov Gallery in Moscow, the British Museum in London and the Wilhelmshaven Museum.

=== Main exhibitions ===
The artist started to exhibit at an early stage of his career and at least once a year.

- 1914 - Society for the Encouragement of Fine Arts,(Polish: Towarzystwo Zachęty Sztuk Pięknych - TZSP) in Warsaw. where he presented eight paintings, probably created during his studies in Paris.

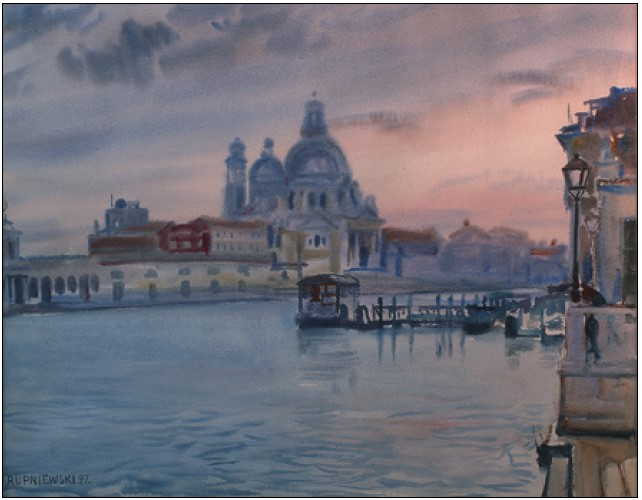
Jerzy Rupniewski: Motyw z Wenecji V, 1927

- 1917 - First Solo exhibition.
- 1917 - Salon 1918, Society for the Encouragement of Fine Arts in Warsaw.
- December 1921 - 3rd exhibition of the TZSP.
- April 1922 - 5th exhibition in Bydgoszcz TZSP.
- January 1924 - Exhibition of the Grupa 12 in Bydgoszcz.
- 1933 - Toruń.
- 1934 - Zachęta National Gallery of Art, Warsaw, where he presented 58 works, mainly oils and watercolours.
- 1935 - Jubilee Salon (1860-1935) of the Warsaw Zachęta galley.
- 1936 - Bydgoszcz exhibition with other local painters.
- November 1937 - Lviv Society of Friends of Fine Arts.
- 1938 - exhibition of watercolors at the Palace of Fine Arts in Kraków, with – among others – Franciszek Jaźwiecki, Ludwik Misky and Mieszko Jabłoński.
- 1938 - Trade Union of Polish Visual Artists in Lviv.
- June 1939 - Travelling Exhibition of Fine Arts in Bydgoszcz, with Marian Turwid, Piotr Triebler, Aleksander Jędrzejewski, Jerzy Faczyński.
- 1947 - Rupniewski's last solo exhibition, associated with the 35th anniversary of his artistic work, displayed 78 paintings.

For each exhibition, Rupniewski used to bring between 12 and 30 works.

== Personal life ==
From 1920, Rupniewski married Janina née Grabowska. The couple had a daughter and 3 sons. Although he never realized a self-portrait, he made portraits of his family members (Prządka, Portret matki and Portret syna - English: Spinner, Portrait of the mother and Portrait of the son).

They lost their youngest son during the Warsaw Uprising.

== Rewards and recognition ==
Rupniewski received awards at the Zachęta Salons in Warsaw: Bronze Medal (1930) and the Silver Medal (1936, 1937).

In 1981, a street in the district of Fordon was named after him.

== See also ==
- Bydgoszcz
- List of Polish people
