= For a Change Fund =

Polish LGBT+ non-profit organization

- Fundusz dla Odmiany
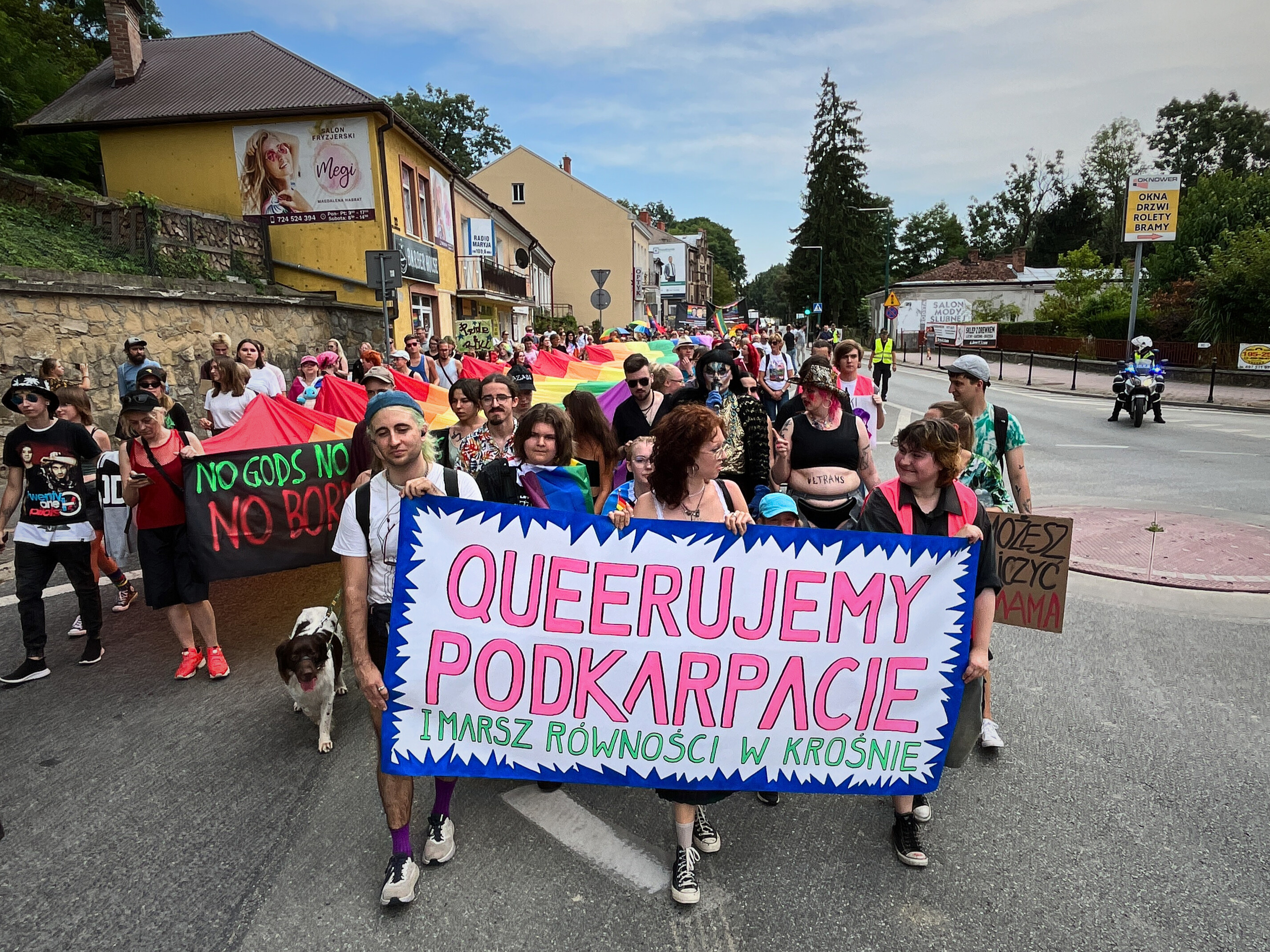
- First pride in Krosno – small city in a conservative province of southeastern Poland
- Formation: 2019-06-19
- Founder: Aleksandra Muzinska, Malgorzata Maciejewska
- Legal status: foundation
- Headquarters: Warsaw, Poland
- Fields: supporting LGBT+ communities
- Website: https://dlaodmiany.org.pl/en

For a Change Fund (actual name: Fundusz dla Odmiany, abbreviation: FDO) – a nationwide Polish non-governmental organization working to support the LGBT+ community outside major cities, mainly in small towns and rural areas. The Fund was established in 2019 on the initiative of Aleksandra Muzinska and Malgorzata Maciejewska, LGBT+ activists formerly associated with the Love Does Not Exclude Association. The Fund has the status of a public benefit organization and is a member of ILGA.

The organization's mission statement is to:

- strengthen and support individuals and groups who wish to create open communities through micro-grants and technical support,
- mobilize allies to act and support LGBT+ people,
- build a community of people, who work on grassroots and local levels to enhance LGBT+ equality outside of big urban centers

In December 2020, the Fund received the LGBT+ Diamonds Awards business award in the “Partnership of the Year” category.

== Grants for local LGBT+ activities ==
The Fund organizes grant calls for organizations, informal groups, collectives and individuals that are already working or would like to start working for the equality of LGBT+ people in their local community. The organization prioritizes initiatives that:

- are active in rural areas or small towns, or work for the LGBT+ community in small towns and rural areas, and if they are active in large cities, then at the neighborhood or district level,
- are active in localities where there have been no activities for LGBT+ people so far,
- act on behalf of: non-binary, transgender, intersex, queer, or any other group within the LGBT+ community in need of special support, assistance or protection,,
- focus on that part of the LGBT+ community that experiences intersectional discrimination, such as LGBT+ people with disabilities, queer women living in rural areas and small towns.

Since 2020, the Fund has provided grants of PLN 465,000 (EUR 110,00) for local activities in 57 localities, including Krosno, Wygnanka, Legnica, Nowiny, Bydgoszcz and Gniezno.

== Participatory grantmaking ==
For a Change Fund is the second organization in Poland, after the Feminist Fund, to provide grants under a participatory approach. The participatory approach is based on community peer review of applications and giving the decision to give grants to those groups and initiatives that apply for a grant. Based on the community evaluation, a ranking is created, which is reviewed by a Community Panel. It is composed of former grantees and donors of the Fund, as well as expert persons from local communities. The Panel's task is to verify that the community assessment reflects the Fund's priorities and, if necessary, to award additional grants.

According to Cynthia Gibson researcher on participatory systems, the implementation of participatory mechanisms in grantmaking results in: democratization of philanthropy, better decisions and outcomes of funded activities, promotion of equality and social justice, and strengthening of ties, trust and involvement of the community itself.

== “Colors of Hope” campaign ==
In June 2022, the organization launched the “Colors of Hope” campaign. The campaign consisted of six video spots featuring the stories of LGBT+ individuals and groups who organized local activities for LGBT+ people with the help of the Fund. The campaign featured:

- Maria Jaszczyk, a retired teacher from Nowiny near Zlotow
- Rainbow Legnica – a local group of LGBT+ people and allies
- Greta Pekala with the Rainbow Tarnow group
- Queer Silesia – an informal queer collective from Katowice
- Ef Furgal together with the Girl on the Spectrum Foundation from Krakow
- Artistic group LICK IT NOW together with professor Krystyna Duniec

== Social survey of kindness towards LGBT+ people in Poland ==
In the summer of 2021, the organization conducted its first survey of allyship and benevolence toward LGBT+ people. The survey was conducted for the organization's own strategic needs, but partial findings were presented to the public.

== Collaborative Funds ==
For a Change Fund, together with external partners, runs so-called collaborative funds on a joint initiative basis or by giving legal entity and support to already existing funds run by informal groups. Currently, these are operating in this way:

- Milo Mazurkiewicz Solidarity Fund – a grassroot and informal support initiative for trans women and non-binary people, founded in 2020 by: Zuzanna Mazur, Helena de Cleyre, Maja Buk, Lena Rodziewicz and Dag Fajt. The fund honors the memory of Milo Mazurkiewicz, a transgender activist whose suicide death in 2019 shocked the LGBTQIA community in Poland.
- Polish Prides Fund – a joint initiative of the For a Change Fund and the Polish Prides Alliance, bringing together more than 30 independent local organizations and informal groups organizing prides across Poland. The Fund offers micro-grants to organize prides in small cities.
