= Jędrzejewski =

Jędrzejewski (feminine Jędrzejewska) is a Polish surname. Notable people include:

- Aleksander Jędrzejewski, Polish painter
- Camille Jedrzejewski (born 2002), French sport shooter
- Dominik Jędrzejewski, Polish Roman Catholic priest
- Marcin Jędrzejewski, Polish speedway rider
- Sidonia Jędrzejewska, Polish politician
- Władysław Jędrzejewski, Polish general
- Władysław Jędrzejewski (boxer), Polish boxer
