= Jan Biziel =

Physician, social activist, Bydgoszcz, Poland, 19th-20th century

- Born: 12 October 1858; Bromberg, Kingdom of Prussia
- Died: 4 February 1934 (aged 75); Bydgoszcz, Poland
- Occupations: physician, social activist
- Years active: 1880s-1930s
- Awards

Jan Biziel (1858–1934) was a German and Polish physician, social activist, city councilor of Bydgoszcz. He was designated "Honorary Citizen of Bydgoszcz" in 1930.

== Biography ==
Jan Łukasz Biziel was born on 12 October 1858 in Osieczna, Leszno County. He was the son of Rozalia née Pajkert and Franciszek Biziel, a farmer. He was the younger son of a very large family, having 4 brothers and 6 sisters. He attended the gymnasium in Leszno from 1872 to 1879, then he studied medicine at Leipzig's and Greifswald's universities.

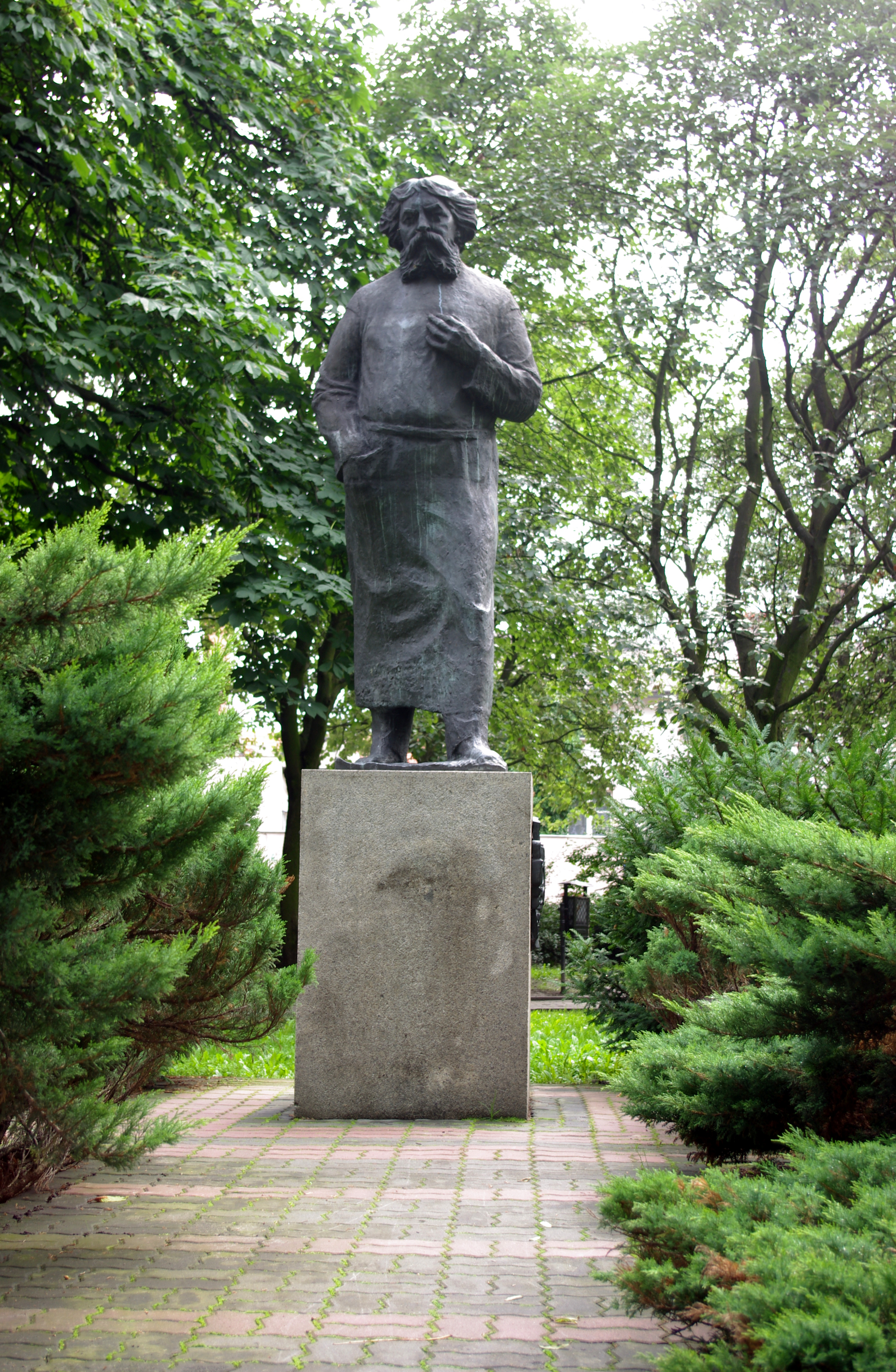
Statue of Ludwik Rydygier in Chełmno

He started his medical practice in Chełmno: there he gained experience in the field of medical knowledge and perfected his practice. In particular he worked under the attention of Ludwik Rydygier, the famous Polish surgeon who later became professor at the Jagiellonian University of Kraków. Leaving Chełmno, he spent the next five years in Krzywiń, hometown of his wife Maria.

In 1902, they moved to Wrocław where Jan worked for four years at the hospital: their third daughter was born there. Finally, on 28 March 1906, the Biziel family moved to Bromberg, living at 3 Cieszkowskiego street. The Biziel's later purchased a house at May 3 street (Nr.8), which Pelagia, one of their daughter, kept till after WWII.

At that time, there were already several private and public hospitals in Bromberg/Bydgoszcz. Most of the physicians were German: Jan Biziel joined the small group of Polish doctors which included, among others, Emil Warmiński, the first Polish medic in the city.

On 11 November 1918 Poland regained independence. However, at that time, Bydgoszcz was still part of German territory. To avoid this fate, an uprising broke out in the city: power was taken over by a "Workers' and Soldiers' Council", which temporarily had control upon the local administration. On November 16, a "Polish People's Council" was set up, chaired by Jan Biziel, with Jan Teska as secretary. As such, he had been representing the Polish residents of Bydgoszcz to the discussion with partitioning authorities.

During the fights following the Greater Poland uprising, while working at the garrison hospital at 11 Jagiellońska street, Dr. Biziel treated and operated the wounded insurgents, in hospitals but also in private homes. He succeeded in having secretly transferred out of hospital Polish soldiers facing death penalty for desertion from the Prussian army, by issuing false documents to allow them to reach safe houses. Dr. Biziel ran as well an underground hospital, which was organized in the Stryszyk family house at 12 Długa Street during the battles near Bydgoszcz.

In December 1918, Jan participated in the sessions of the Sejm of the district in Poznań as the head of the delegation representing the interests of the Bydgoszcz city. At the ceremony of transfer of authority from German to Polish rule which took place on the Old Market square on 19 January 1920, Jan Biziel was one of the Polish representatives, while another Bydgoszcz citizen, Hermann Dietz, sided with the German party. The following day, as president of the Polish People's Council, he welcomed Polish troops entering the city.

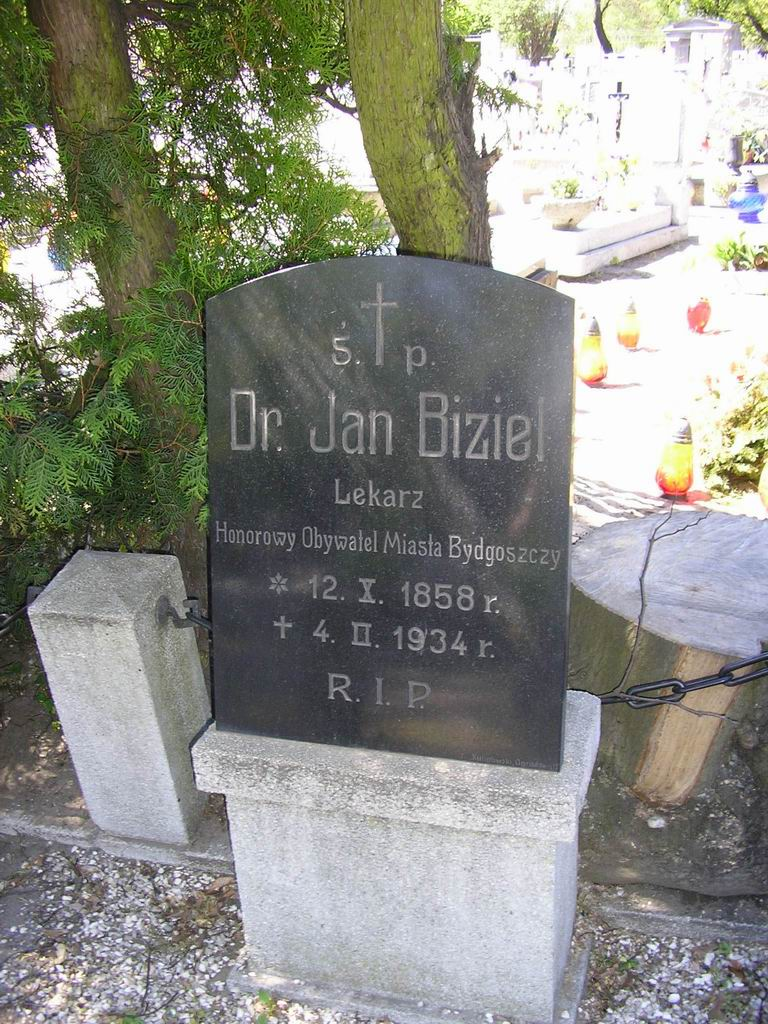
Jab Biziel gravestone

On 4 August 1920 Biziel was appointed a member of the Provisional City Council (1920–1921). After the resignation of Jan Maciaszek, the interim city president in July 1921, he was offered his position, but did not accept it. In 1921, he became the chairman of the Polish Election Committee in Bydgoszcz and was elected as a city councilor from the Civic List, representing the interests of the Christian-democratic party from 1922 to 1925. He chaired the City Council until the end of March 1922.

In the 1920s, Dr. Biziel was the head physician of the Municipal Clinic and the chief of the internal department. He was active in the Poznań-Pomeranian Medical Chamber and the Medical Society for the Nadnotecki District in Bydgoszcz. From 1925 onwards, he shifted his focus on private medical practice. In 1930, Jan Biziel bought the tenement at 8 3 Maja street, which was managed till after the Second World War by one of his daughters, Pelagia.

In May 1933, he was victim of a cerebral stroke. He could not get out of bed for five months and after recovery he had to be cared after. He eventually died on 4 February 1934 in Bydgoszcz. Two days later, the City Council convened for an extraordinary session to honor his memory. Jan Biziel's funeral took place on 7 February 1934, in the Nowofarny Cemetery of Bydgoszcz: in accordance with his last will, the ceremony was kept extremely modest.

In his farewell speech, city president Leon Barciszewski emphasized that Jan Biziel was a man "who disdained nothing more than external glitz, who shy away and escaped from fame and popularity. Quietly and imperceptibly, he glided through the streets of Bydgoszcz, bringing physical help and spiritual relief to all who called him day and night."

The care of his tombstone in Nowofarny cemetery is under the responsibility of the City Hall and High School Nr.7 in Bydgoszcz.

== Family ==
Jan Biziel was married to Maria Ludwika née Badeltów, a teacher from Krzywin. Maria was the daughter of Paweł Badelt, very active in his city. He founded the first pharmacy of Krzywin (on 11 March 1870), co-founded the "People's Bank" in Krzywin and chaired the "Strzelce's Fowler Brotherhood" (Polish: Bractwa kurkowe) of the town. He died in 1901.

They had three daughters:

- Maria Ludwika (born 1894), a teacher;
- Pelagia Rozalia (born 1896) a teacher as well;
- Ludwika Izabela (born 1903) who was an assistant at the Municipal Library in Bydgoszcz.

Jan Biziel family has many descendants, most of them live in Poland (Poznań, Wrocław).

== Activism ==
Upon his arrival in Bromberg in 1906, Jan Biziel combined his medical practice with nationalist and social activism.

He was active in many forums such as:

- the "Industrial Association of Bydgoszcz" (Polish: Towarzystwo Przemysłowe w Bydgoszczy) created by Teofil Magdziński in 1872;
- the "Craftsmen Association" (Polish: Towarzystwo Rzemieślników);
- the "Society of Polish-Catholic Workers" (Polish: Towarzystwa Robotników Polsko-Katolickich) as an honorary member.

He was also dynamic in the parish of the St. Martin and Nicholas cathedral. His own house at 3 Cieszkowskiego street quickly became a radiating center of social welfare and patriotism.

In 1909, he headed the County Committee of the "People's Reading Room Society". On his initiative, a bookshop promoting Polish language was established in Bromberg at the end of 1911, at the crossing of today's Mostowa and Jagiellońska streets.

The same year, Biziel joined the city Popular National Union and soon became one of its leading members alongside Jan Teska (1876–1945). In 1914, he was one of the co-founder and representative at the supervisory board of the "Discount Bank" in Bydgoszcz. The role of this institution was to grant loans to peasants wrestling for land with the Prussian Colonization Commission.

Dr. Biziel used to give many historical lectures. In 1917, he was granted membership to the "Poznań Honorary Committee of the Centenary of the Death of Tadeusz Kościuszko". One of the commemorations in November 1917, was accompanied by his speech in the premises of the Polish House, created by his late colleague Emil Warmińskiego at today's 11 Warmińskiego street.

== Honors ==
- He was awarded Officer's Cross of the Order of Polonia Restituta (Polish: Krzyże Oficerskim Orderu Odrodzenia Polski) on 2 May 1922;
- In January 1930, the Bydgoszcz municipality adopted a resolution nominating Jan Biziel as an Honorary Citizen of Bydgoszcz, for outstanding social services to the benefit of Polish citizens of the city. The ceremony was held on 19 January 1930, the 10th anniversary Bydgoszcz re-joining the motherland. The city commendation mentioned: "For several dozen years he devoted himself tirelessly to social work in various organizations in our city."
- A street on Bydgoszcz, in "Wzgórze Wolności" district has been named after him.
- Since 1992, Dr. Jan Biziel is the patron the Provincial Hospital of Bydgoszcz ("Szpital Uniwersytecki nr 2 im. dr. Jana Biziela").
- In 1999, a commemorative plaque has been unveiled at 3 Cieszkowskiego street, Biziel's house in Bygoszcz.
- In June 2014, another commemorative plaque has been placed on the wall of the tenement at 12 Długa Street, to remember that during the Greater Poland uprising, the premises (then owned by Stanislaw Stryszyk) housed an infirmary for the wounded insurgents tended with the heroic help of Dr. Jan Biziel.

== Gallery ==
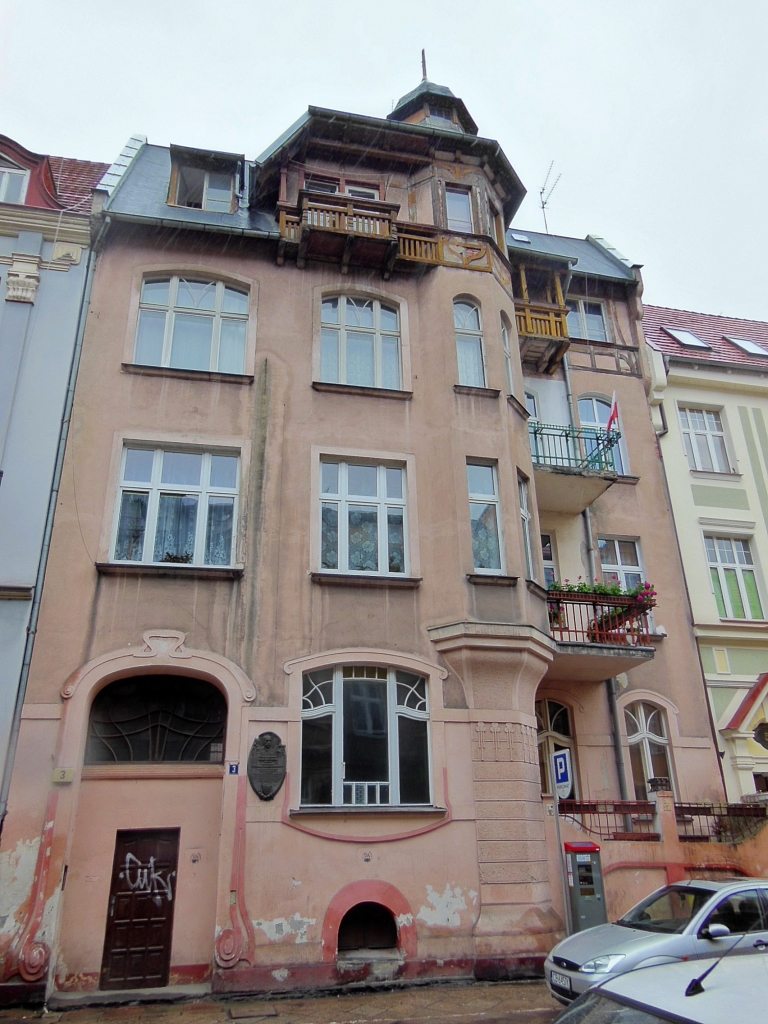
Tenement at 3 Cieszkowskiego street, home of the Biziel family

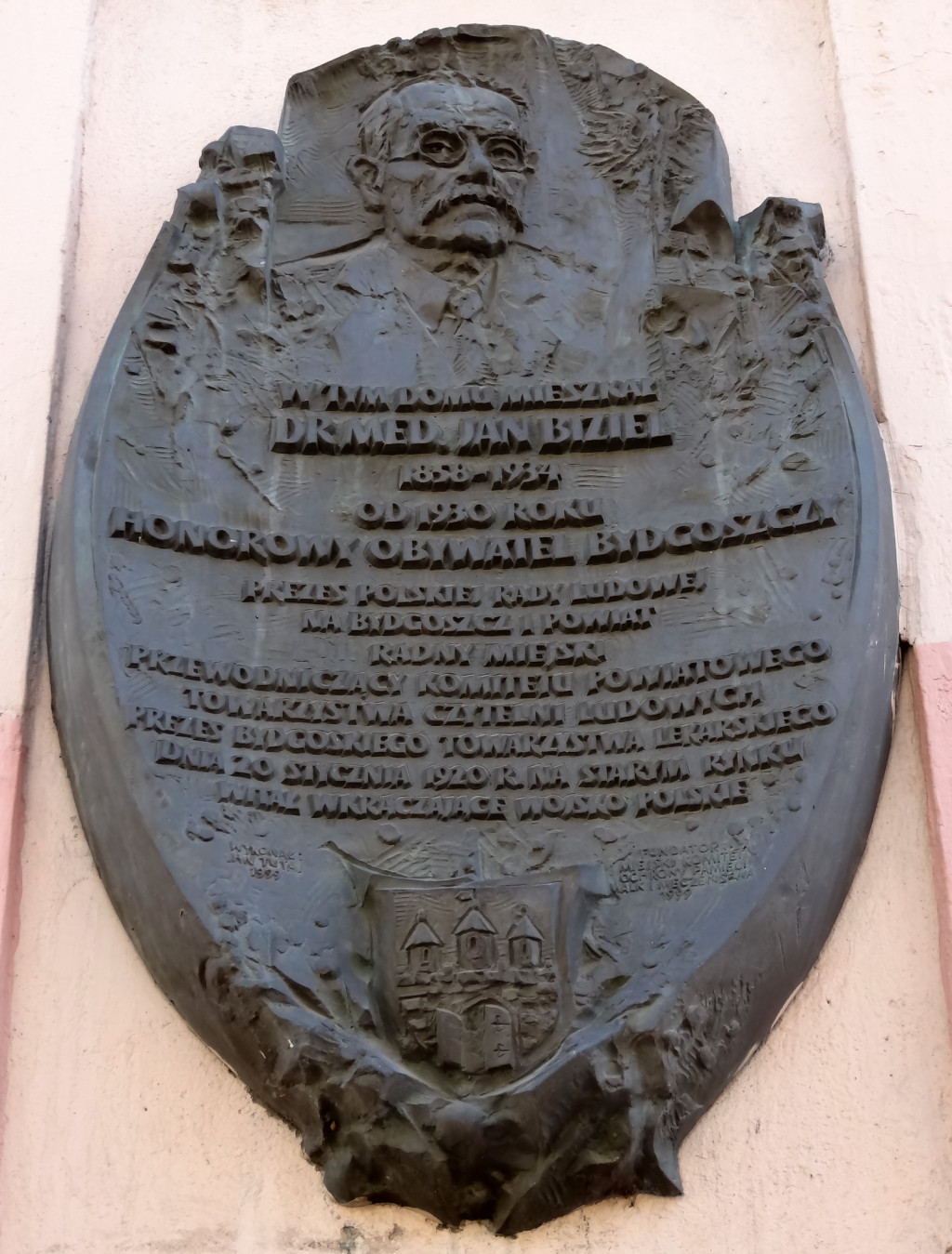
Commemorative plaque to J. Biziel at 3 Cieszkowskiego

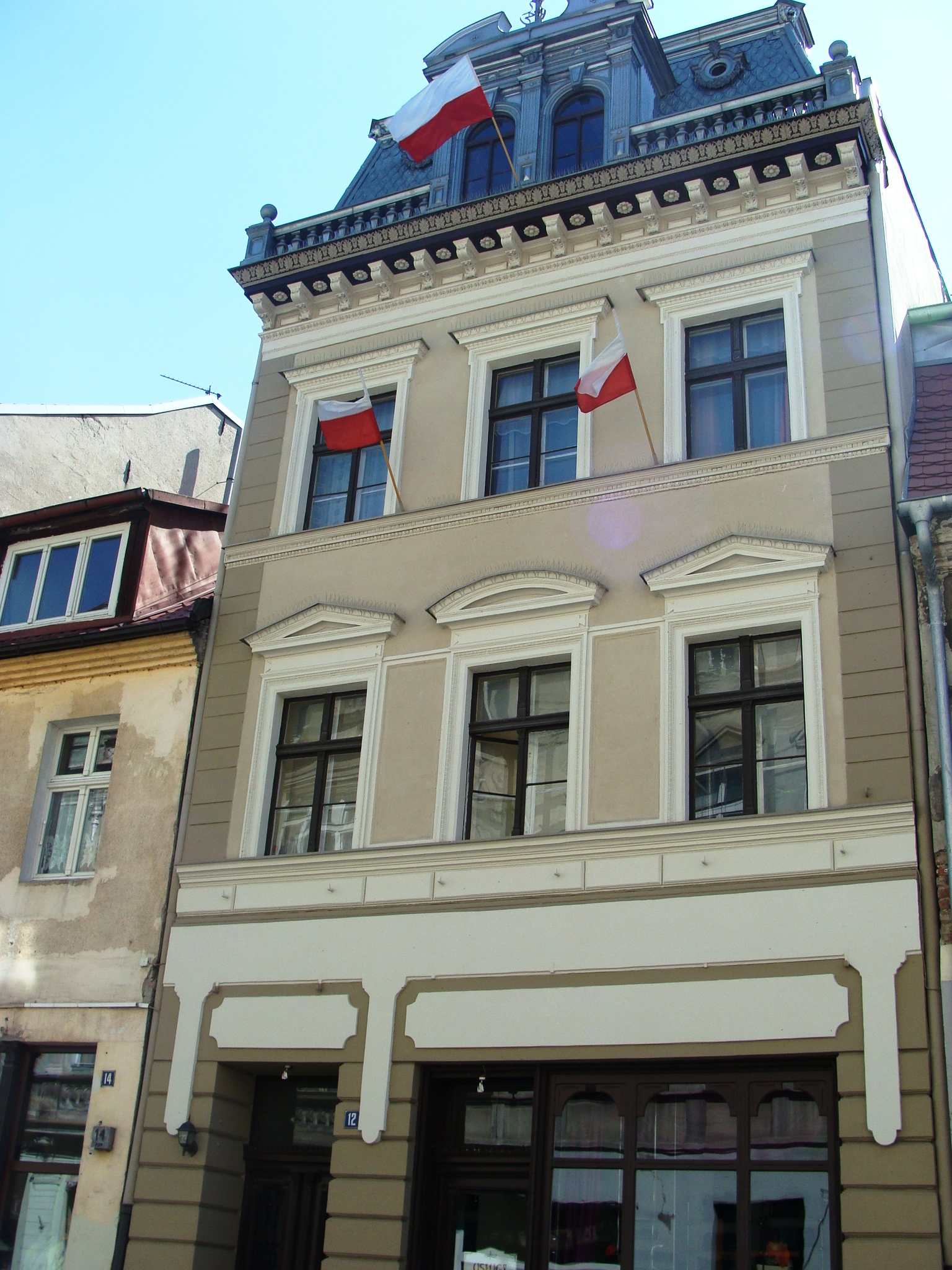
House at 12 Długa street, which housed an improvised infirmary during the Greater Poland uprising

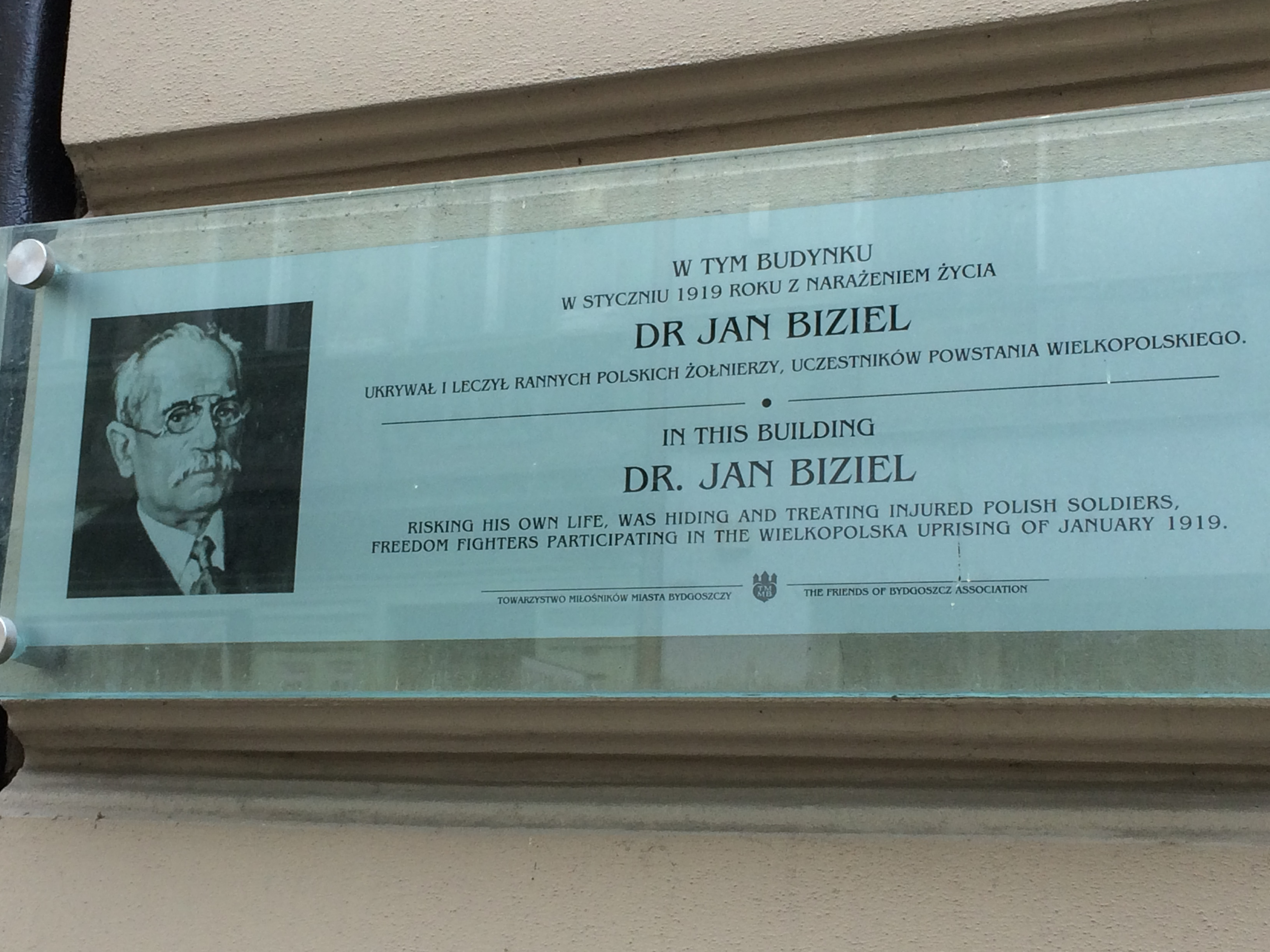
Commemorative plaque to Dr. Biziel at 12 Długa street

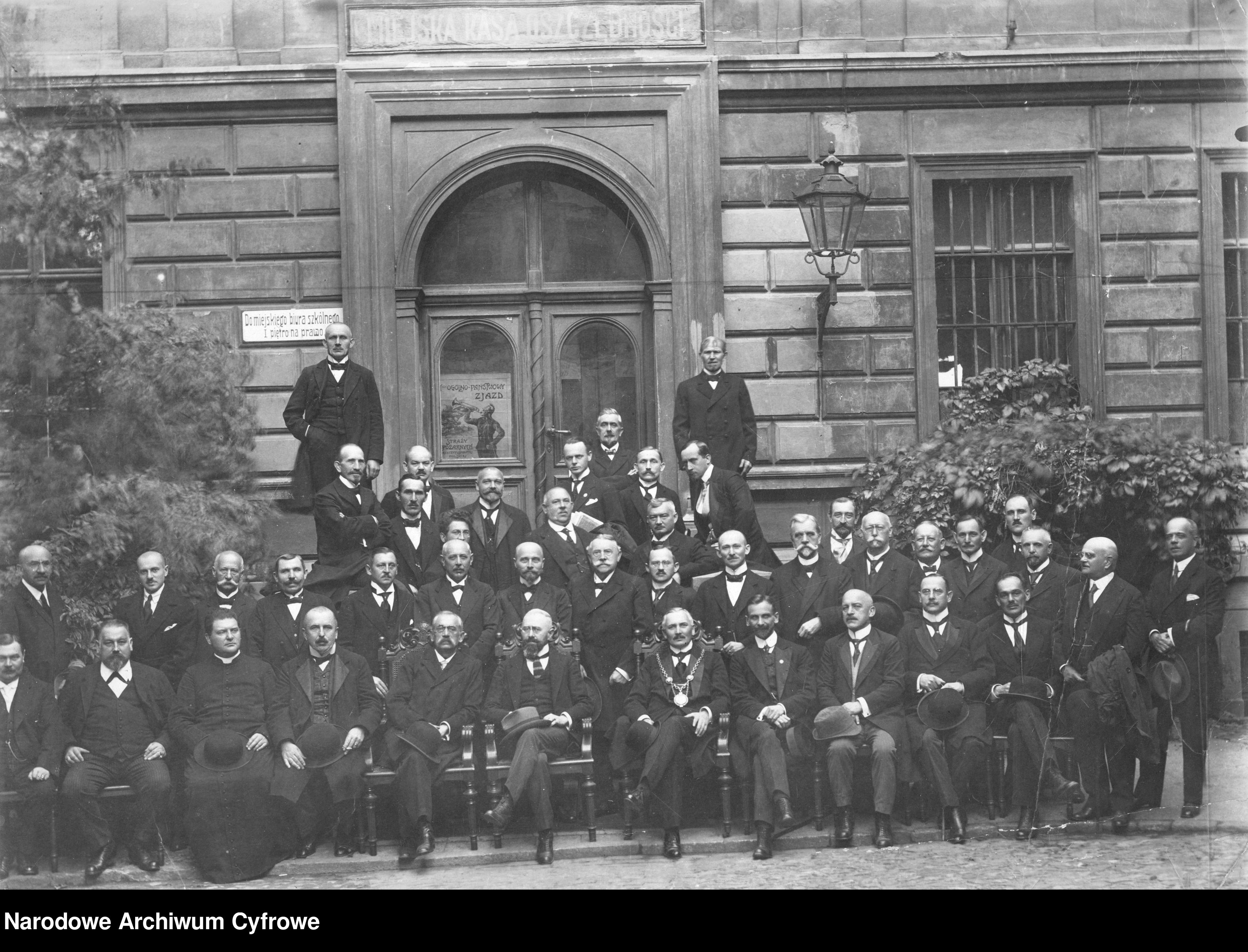
First city council in Bydgoszcz (1922). Jan Biziel is on the first row, 5th from the left.

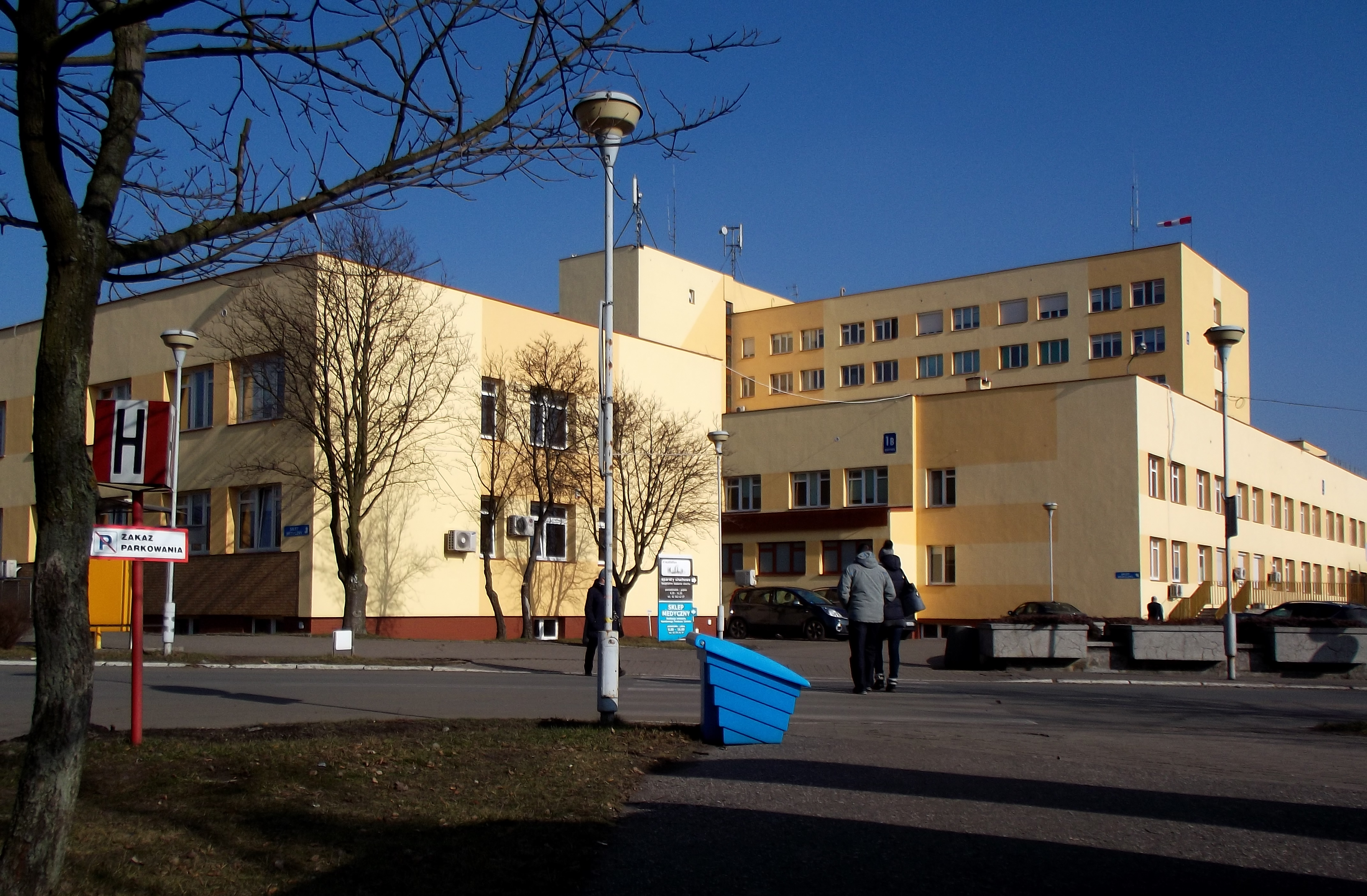
View of "Jan Biziel" University Hospital Nr.2 in Bydgoszcz

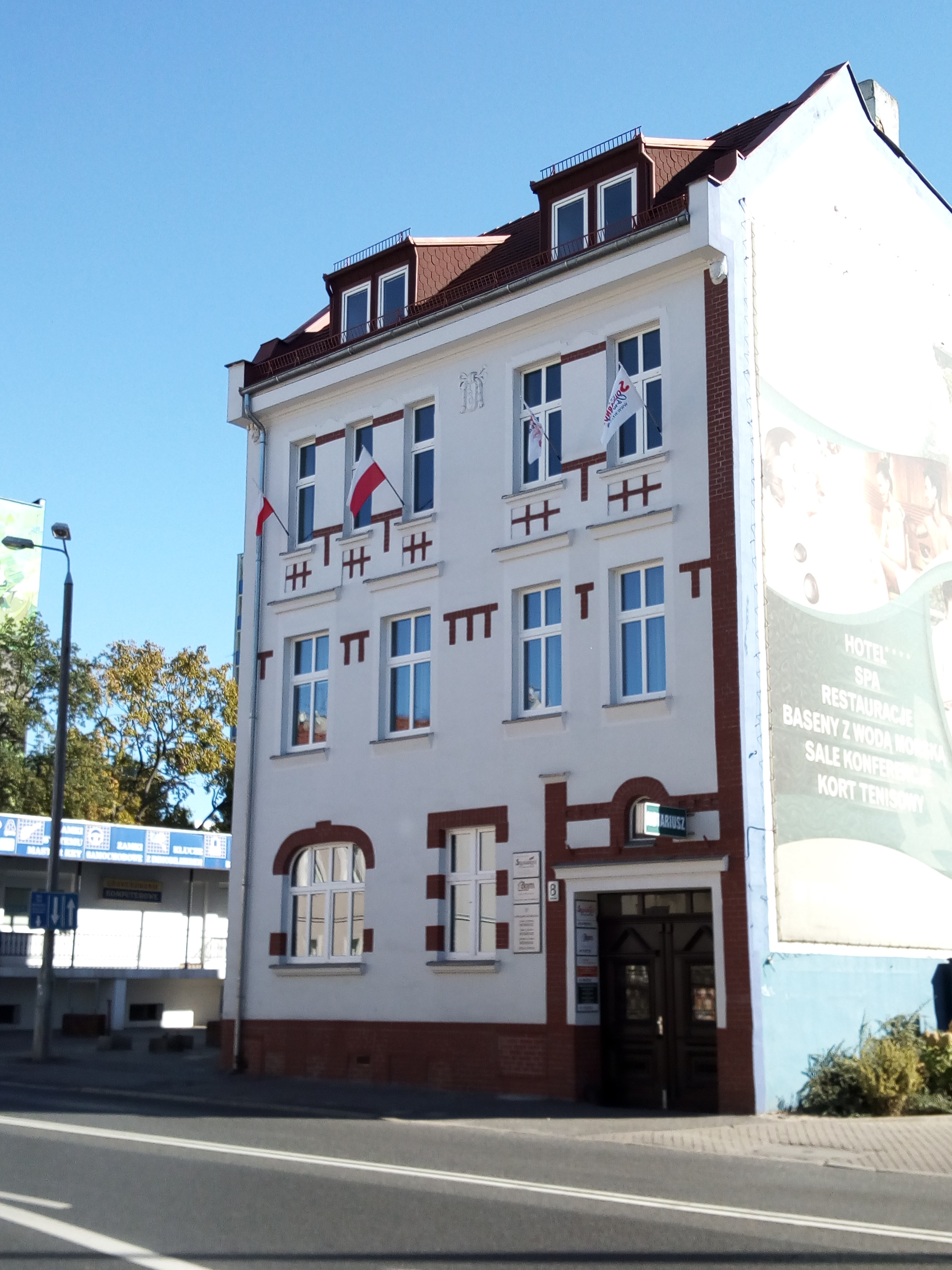
Other Biziel's family house at May 3 street (Nr.8)

== See also ==
- Bydgoszcz
- Emil Warmiński
- Jan Teska
- List of Polish people

== Bibliography ==
- Błażejewski Stanisław, Kutta Janusz, Romaniuk Marek (1995). Bydgoski Słownik Biograficzny. Tom II. Bydgoszcz: Kujawsko-Pomorskie Towarzystwo Kulturalne Wojewódzki Ośrodek Kultury. pp. 35–37. ISBN 8385327274.
- Kutta, Janusz (1992). Honorowi obywatele miasta Bydgoszczy (1920-1939). Bydgoszcz. p. 12.
- Hojka, Małgorzata (1999). Wierni Macierzy: bydgoszczanie w Powstaniu Wielkopolskim 1918/19. Bydgoszcz. p. 14. ISBN 8391257452.
