= Zygmunt Felczak =

Polish politician, national activist (1903–1946)

- Born: 2 May 1903; Chorki, Congress Poland
- Died: 3 July 1946 (aged 43); Bydgoszcz, Poland
- Resting place: Starofarny Cemetery, Bydgoszcz
- Other names: Bożedar, Bydgoski, Jasiński, Zygmunt
- Occupations: Journalist, publicist, national activist and politician
- Known for: Daily newspaper "Ilustrowany Kurier Polski"
- Awards

Zygmunt Felczak (2 May 1903 – 3 July 1946) was a Polish politician. He was a member of the State National Council and a deputy governor of Pomerania. As an activist of the National Workers' Party and the Labour Faction, he founded the daily paper "Ilustrowany Kurier Polski" and took part in the Warsaw Uprising.

== Biography ==
=== Youth years ===
Zygmunt Felczak was the son of Antoni, a farmer, and Michalina, née Pałczyńska. He had seven siblings. His father was a local social activist. His mother came from an impoverished noble family, whose ancestors were sent by Tsarist authorities to Siberia after their participation in the uprisings of November 1830–1831 and January 1863.

Antoni and Michalina were owners of a 20 hectares (49 acres) domain in the village of Chorki, 50 kilometres (31 mi) north west of Łódź, in then Russian-controlled Poland. Their children were brought up in the worship of the family insurgent tradition. Later, a communist judge would refer to Antoni Felczak as a kulak.

Zygmunt attended the elementary school of the Chorki before going from 1915 to a secondary school in Łęczyca.

=== Interwar Period ===
In 1920, Zygmunt took part as a volunteer in the Polish–Soviet War, serving first in the 137th Infantry Regiment. Afterwards, he took part in the defense of Płock with the 21st Rifle Regiment of Kaunas.

After the war, he resumed his education in Łęczyca, where in 1923 he passed his matura. Felczak then entered the Faculty of Law and Administration at the University of Warsaw. A year later, he stopped his studies to start working as a teacher in a public school in Łódź.

After this stint, he resumed humanities at the University of Poznań in 1926. As a student, he was active in the "Union of Young Workers "Jedność" (Polish: Związek Młodzieży Pracującej "ZMP Jedność") and in the National Workers' Party or NPR (Polish: Narodowa Partia Robotnicza), where he became in 1928, the editor of its Wielkopolska newspaper "Prawda" (Truth). He kept having short breaks in his schooling till 1931, eventually completing 11 trimesters at this university.

In 1931, he moved to Toruń to work as the secretary of the NPR District Board in Pomerania and editor of the magazine "Obrona Ludu" (Defence of the People). His articles were then described as radically against Piłsudski's ruling Sanation and strongly anti-communist.

In one of his articles he stated for instance: "Communism leads workers into the embrace of poverty, hunger and civil slavery. [...] We will relentlessly expose this vile, false and deceitful game of the red devils not in the name of anything other than in the name of the interests of the working masses".

He mentioned later also: "We do not want to introduce a collective system in Poland, and we consider communists to be tightrope walkers and the same fascists as the supporters of Hitler and Mussolini".

Felczak suggested rebuilding social relations in the spirit of the Christian morality. In May 1934, he was elected a member of the Supreme Council of the NPR. At the same time, he had been leading the "ZMP Jedność" and was the editor-in-chief of the magazine "Demokrata". At that time Zygmunt was closely associated with Karol Popiel who commissioned him to organize and energize the Youth Branch of the NPR. On July 28, 1935, he became a member of the Main Executive Committee of the movement.

In October 1937, the NPR merged with the Polish Christian Democratic Party into the Labour Faction. Felczak kept its position as a member of the Main Board of the newly established Party.

During the 1930s, he opposed any Polish-German rapprochement, rather leaning on a reconciliation of Poland with the Soviet Union. He had been regularly brought to court for his anti-government activities and was imprisoned twice for insulting Józef Piłsudski and President Ignacy Mościcki.

In the late 1930s, Zygmunt Felczak moved to Bydgoszcz. From the end of 1937 till 1939, he was the deputy editor-in-chief of the local daily paper "Dziennik Bydgoski".

=== World War II ===
In 1939, in the growing threat of an attack of the Third Reich in Poland, he called for young people to actively resist, stating, for instance: "We are ready to make all sacrifices for the integrity and independence of our borders. The Germanic onslaught can only enter Poland over the corpses of all the working youth."

After the outbreak of the war and the occupation of Bydgoszcz by Nazi forces, Gestapo looked for Felczak. In October 1939, he took refuge in his home village, from where he settled in March 1940 to Warsaw. He moved to the resistance, under various aliases as "Bydgoski" or "Jasiński".

In 1939, he re-organized the underground Labour Faction, with the help of Franciszek Kwieciński, leader of the then clandestine movement. On his initiative, in 1940, secessionist activists of the leftist party "NPR-Lewica" were re-integrated into the Labour Faction. During these years, Felczak, through Feliks Widy-Wirskifelt, was influenced by Jan Stachniuk, the leader of the neo-pagan group Zadruga. Zygmunt then began to drift away from his Christian-social beliefs.

After the arrest of Franciszek Kwieciński, he was designated on 29 March 1942, as the new representative of the Labor Party in the underground Political Consultative Committee (PKP). Taking advantage of this position, he steered the political configuration of the PKP, striving to replace National Party representatives with communists from the Polish Workers' Party (PPR). He tried to win over Karol Popiel in London: to this end, he sent messages from the Polish Underground State, via his brother Wacław, then a courier of the Polish government-in-exile.

On 25 October 1942, the leadership of the Labour Faction (Stronnictwo Pracy-SP) recalled Felczak from PKP, accusing him of political intrigue. In the last weeks of autumn 1942, he was expelled from the SP leading committee and in February of the following year, together with his colleagues Jan Teska and Henryk Trzebiński, he was excluded from the SP. In July 1943, he created and led a new political group, the "Stronnictwo Zrywu Narodowego" (National Rising Party) or "Zryw".

During the Warsaw Uprising, Zygmunt Felczak (a.k.a. "Bożedar") fought in the ranks of the Home Army or Armia Krajowa. At the surrender, he escaped from the transport of prisoners and hid in Włochy district of Warsaw.

=== Post-war years (1945–1946) ===
The year 1945 was an exceptionally dynamic period for Felczak.

- In January, he declared himself willing to cooperate with the Provisional Government of the Republic of Poland;
- In February, he was appointed deputy governor of the Pomeranian Voivodeship.
- Having expressed his intent to restore the Labour Part (SP), based on his own movement "Zryw", he gained the support of the Communist Party (PPR). On July 15, the revival of the SP -albeit subordinated to the PPR- was proclaimed during the congress in Bydgoszcz.
- In November 1945, Karol Popiel validated the merging of the "Zryw" with the SP: Zygmunt Felczak became one of the vice-presidents of the Executive Committee's new entity.
- In December, Zygmunt was president of the re-branded-SP at the State National Council.

In February 1946, he became president of the Provincial Board of the SP in Bydgoszcz. Although already seriously ill, Felczak deliberately left a Warsaw hospital to go to Bydgoszcz to help out on local preparations of the 1946 Polish people's referendum held on June 30. The full support he provided to this biased voting put him in direct conflict with his ancient mentor Karol Popiel, who favored Stanisław Mikołajczyk and his popular Polish People's Party.

Locally, he was politically committed to actively rekindle the culture life in Bydgoszcz and in the Pomeranian Voivodeship. In this regard, he collaborated with Marian Turwid, designated to lead the Department of Culture and Art of the Voivodeship Office. He took part in the establishment of, among others:

- the Pomeranian Arts House;
- the social and literary magazine "Arkona";
- the Publishing Cooperative "Zryw" which edited from 1945 the "Ilustrowany Kurier Polski" (Illustrated Polish Courier).

After WWII, likewise, Felczak carried out journalistic activities. His articles were published in the papers "Ilustrowany Kurier Polski", "Arkona" or "Odnowa".

In January 1946, his book Droga Wielkiej Odnowy (The Road of Great Renewal) was published. In it, he exposed his vision of a "civilizational armament" of Poland, encompassing the following questions:

- a national industrialization;
- the reconstruction of the countryside combined with an intensification of agriculture;
- the assimilation of the Western Borderlands;
- the "marinization" of the country Poland, aiming at fully using national sea borders;
- the reconstruction of the spiritual structure of society.

The book, supporting Jan Stachniuk's philosophical ideas, was heavily rejected by the Polish Catholic society.

Zygmunt Felczak died of a liver cirrhosis on 3 July 1946, at his home (6 Sielanka street, Bydgoszcz).

He was buried at the Nowofarny Cemetery in Bydgoszcz on 6 July 1946. The religious ceremony took place at the Saint Vincent de Paul Basilica and was attended by many notables (e.g. Karol Popiel), and in particular by Kazimierz Barcikowski and General Karol Świerczewski who flew from Warsaw for the occasion.

Zygmunt Felczak was awarded posthumously (1946) the Order of the Cross of Grunwald – second class.

== Family ==
In 1940, Zygmunt Felczak married Anna Gorońska. They had a son, Bogdan, born in 1926. During the war, Bogdan was imprisoned by the Gestapo and sent to Buchenwald concentration camp.

=== Wacław , Zygmunt's brother ===
Wacław Felczak was born as the eighth and last child in the family. He attended schools in Chorki and Grabów, then the Secondary school in Płock. After graduating from high school in 1934 in Toruń, he began studying history at the University of Poznań. On 28 June 1938, he received a degree of Master of Philosophy. At the instigation of one of the professors, Wacław started learning Hungarian and became interested in the history of Polish-Hungarian relations. He founded the student Circle of "Friends of Hungary": in August 1936, he traveled to Hungary for the first time to attend summer courses in Hungarian culture and language. He received a scholarship from the Hungarian government and in October 1938, he went to Budapest for further studies. At the same time, he was a press correspondent associated with the Labour Faction (SP) where his brother Zygmunt was active. This year, he published an article in a historical paper ("Roczniki Historyczne"), "The moods of Wielkopolska towards the Hungarian revolution in 1848–1849" (Polish: Nastroje Wielkopolski wobec rewolucji węgierskiej w r. 1848–1849) and another which appeared only after the war.

Wacław was not mobilized during the invasion of Poland, although like many young men, he hoped to get an assignment. The Plecazk's village of Golbice was soon incorporated into the German territory and the family was displaced by the Nazis in the spring of 1940. He and his brother Zygmunt joined the underground activities: Wacław arrived in Warsaw in mid-April 1940 and met there Franciszek Kwieciński and Ryszard Świętochowski, a friend of General Władysław Sikorski, who was organizing the underground political "Central Committee of Independence". Rapidly, he accepted to direct a courier route between Sikorski's government in Budapest and Poland. He also personally crossed the borders dozens of times, moving mail and money, often via a trail in the Tatra Mountains.

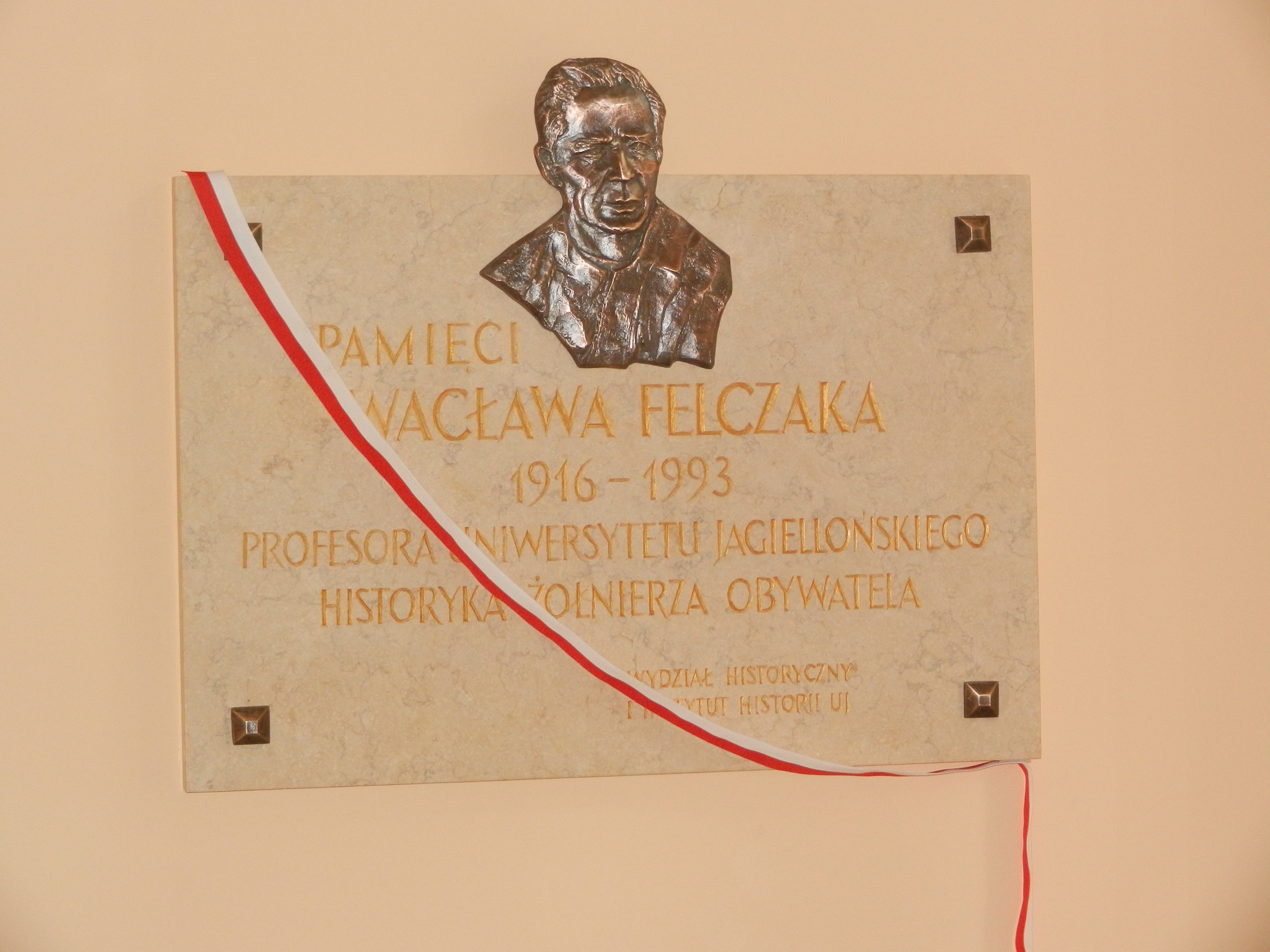
Commemorative plaque of prof. Wacław Felczak, Jagiellonian University

In addition, he was involved in information activities, which led him to copy magazines opposing anti-government propaganda in collaboration with Tadeusz Chciuk-Celt.

In February 1945, he moved to Kraków and continued his courier activity for the Polish government in exile till 1948. He returned from his last expedition at the end of March 1947, with a status bestowed by the President Władysław Raczkiewicz and Prime Minister Tomasz Arciszewski. In June 1947, Władysław Raczkiewicz died, giving way to many years of division among emigrants and the loss of recognition of the Polish government from the Western powers. At this time, Wacław was living in Paris, devoting himself to scientific work at the Sorbonne. He resumed his courier role in September–October 1948, to help his friends threatened with arrest by the Security Office (UB) to flee Communist Poland:

- Tadeusz Chciuk-Celt with his wife Ewa and their young daughter one-and-a-half-year-old daughter;
- resistants Tadeusz Żelechowski and Jerzy Niemczycki;
- Home Army liaison officer Elżbieta Ungerówna;
- leaders of the Polish People's Party (on Stanisław Mikołajczyk's request).

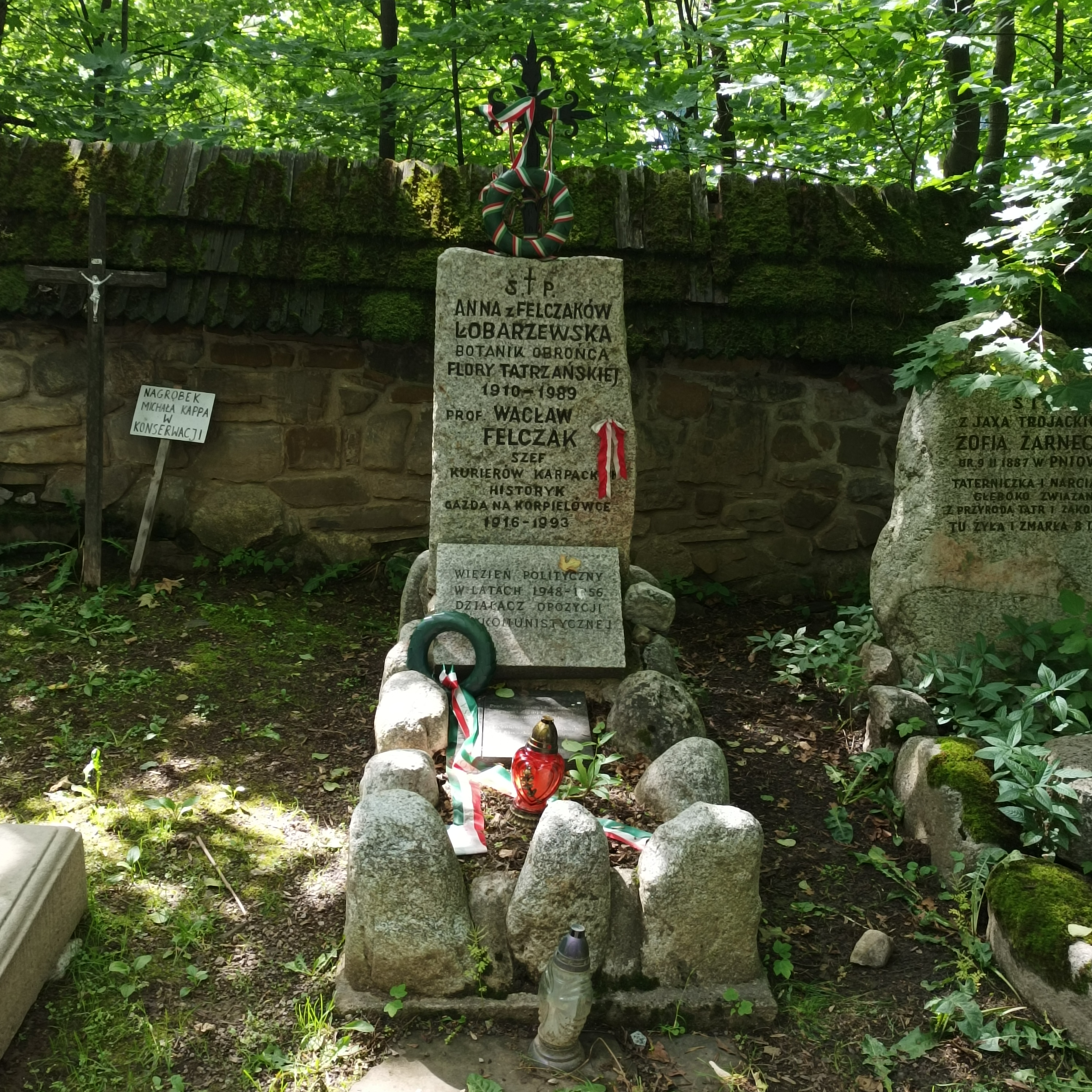
Wacław Felczak tombstone in Zakopane

In early December 1948, Wacław moved from Paris to Czechoslovakia via Innsbruck and Vienna. On 22 December, his party was arrested in Ostrava by the security authorities. In 1948, after a lengthy investigation and two tentatives of escape, he was sentenced to life imprisonment. However, thanks to the Polish Thaw, he was released in October 1956.

He started working in 1958 at the Institute of History of the Jagiellonian University where he obtained his doctorate in 1962 and received his habilitation to teach in 1968.

In the second half of the 1970s, Wacław regularly traveled to Hungary, where he played an important role in the formation of the democratic Hungarian opposition. He was holding lectures in private flats, sharing his vision of history for all nations of the Central Europe with eminent Hungarians such as Árpád Göncz, Miklós Vásárhelyi, Sándor Csoóri or György Szabad. In the fall of 1987, as a visiting scholar, he gave lectures in Budapest where he exchanged with Viktor Orbán, then a young lawyer.

After the fall of Communism, he was appointed on 5 October 1993, a professor at the Jagiellonian University. He died shortly after receiving the nomination. He was buried in Pęksowy Brzyzek cemetery in Zakopane.

== See also ==
- Bydgoszcz
- Tadeusz Chciuk-Celt
- Jan Teska

== Bibliography ==
- (in Polish) Błażejewski, Stanisław; Kutta, Janusz; Romaniuk, Marek (1995). Bydgoski Słownik Biograficzny. Tom II. Bydgoszcz: Kujawsko-Pomorskie Towarzystwo Kulturalne Wojewódzki Ośrodek Kultury. pp. 57–58. ISBN 83-85327-27-4.
- (in Polish) Kunert, Andrzej Krzysztof (1987). Słownik biograficzny konspiracji warszawskiej 1939-1945 T.1. Warszawa: Instytut Wydawniczy PAX. pp. 64–65. ISBN 83-211-0758-3.
- (in Polish) Jastrzębski, Włodzimierz (1984). Zygmunt Felczak (1903-1946). Zasłużeni Pomorzanie w latach II wojny światowej. Wrocław: Zakład Narodowy imienia Ossolińskich. pp. 65–71.
