= Gmina Sosnówka =

Gmina Sosnówka Sosnówka Commune
- Gmina
- Coat of arms
- Interactive map of Gmina Sosnówka
- Coordinates (Sosnówka): 51°45′15″N 23°20′22″E
- Country: Poland
- Voivodeship: Lublin
- County: Biała County
- Seat: Sosnówka

Area
  - Total: 148.43 km^{2} (57.31 sq mi)

Population (2014)
  - Total: 2,532
  - Density: 17.06/km^{2} (44.18/sq mi)
- Website: http://www.sosnowka.pl

Gmina Sosnówka is a rural gmina (administrative district) in Biała County, Lublin Voivodeship, in eastern Poland. Its seat is the village of Sosnówka, which lies approximately 35 kilometres (22 mi) south-east of Biała Podlaska and 78 km (48 mi) north-east of the regional capital Lublin.

The gmina covers an area of 148.43 square kilometres (57.3 sq mi), and as of 2006 its total population is 2,747 (2,532 in 2014).

== Villages ==
Gmina Sosnówka contains the villages and settlements of Czeputka, Dębów, Lipinki, Motwica, Omszana, Pogorzelec, Przechód, Romanów, Rozwadówka, Rozwadówka-Folwark, Sapiehów, Sosnówka, Wygnanka, Żeszczynka and Żuława.

== Neighbouring gminas ==
Gmina Sosnówka is bordered by the gminas of Hanna, Łomazy, Podedwórze, Tuczna, Wisznice and Wyryki.
