= Jan Teska =

Polish journalist and activist (1876–1945)

- Born: 16 July 1876; Chojnica, German Empire
- Died: 24 March 1945 (aged 68); Trojanów, Poland
- Resting place: Nowofarny Cemetery, Bydgoszcz
- Other names: Jawor, Ząbkowski, Józef Topolski
- Occupation(s): Journalist, national activist
- Known for: Creator of the daily "Dziennik Bydgoski" (1920-1939)
- Spouse: Wincentyna Teska
- Children: Lech Jan

Jan Teska (1876-1945) was a Polish journalist, publisher of the Dziennik Bydgoski, a national activist and a Polish politician from the 1900s till the end of World War II.

== Biography ==
=== Prussian partition ===
Jan Teska was born on 16 July 1876 in Chojnica near Poznań. He was the son of Antonina née Gołaska and Antoni, a farmer. After a preparatory year, he passed the 3rd grade exam to enter the Saint Mary Magdalene High School in Poznań. There, he was active in the Scientific Aid Society of the city.

Jan left junior high school after completing the 8th grade. He took his Matura in Wschowa, but did not take the oral exam. Afterwards, he moved to Kraków for over a year, studying Polish language and literature.

On 1 April 1900 he started working in the editorial office of the paper Orędownik (English: Spokesman) in Poznań. He performed one year of military service as a volunteer in the 47th Infantry Regiment of the 10th Division of the German Empire in Poznań. Once released from the army, he transferred to East Prussia to study in Mazury. At that time, he wrote articles for Praca in Poznań and took over the editorial office of Gazeta Polska in Kościan.

After a few months, he moved to Gniezno where he edited until 1907 the local daily paper Lech Gazeta Gnieźnieńska. On 1 November 1907 he went to Bydgoszcz to set up the Dziennik Bydgoski (English: Bydgoszcz Daily). The first issue was published on 2 December 1907, with Teska as its publisher and editor. "Dziennik Bydgoski" became the main Polish newspaper in Bydgoszcz during the Prussian rule. In his work, Jan tried to keep up the Polish spirit among his fellow countrymen. He demonstrated as well his Polishness by actively working in several clubs, such as the Industrial Society (Polish: Towarzystwo Przemysłowe), the People's Libraries Society (Polish: Towarzystwo Czytelni Ludowych) and the Polish Gymnastic Society Sokół (Polish: Polskie Towarzystwo Gimnastyczne "Sokół").

Jan Teska appeared before German courts several times for his national and patriotic activities and eventually received many financial penalties. He even served his last prison sentence in Inowrocław, on the eve of the outbreak of World War I. At his release, Teska was immediately conscripted into the Imperial German Army and sent to the western front in October 1914. He initially fought as a line infantryman and then as a senior private medic.

In November 1918, at the outbreak of the German Revolution, Teska left the service and returned to Bydgoszcz. During the war years, he kept sending articles about the battles, soldiers' accounts, as well as editorials to the "Dziennik Bydgoski" run by his wife Wincentyna.

=== Interwar period ===
In Bydgoszcz, Jan Teska actively participated in national and social activities together with other Polish residents. He became the secretary of the Polish People's Council in Bydgoszcz (Polish: Polska Rada Ludowa w Bydgoszczy), chaired by Jan Biziel, which prepared the handover of the city from German hands. He was also a delegate to the Polish District Sejm (Polish: Polski Sejm Dzielnicowy) gathering in Poznań in December 1918.

On 19 January 1920 he was a member of the Polish delegation which officially took over Bydgoszcz from the German authorities. In 1920, he became a councilor of the temporary City Council, and on 25 June 1925 he was elected city councilor by the City Council. From 1925 to 1931, Teska served as the president of the Union of Pomeranian Journalists (Polish: Syndykat Dziennikarzy Pomorskich).

The post-war crisis and progressive inflation led the "Dziennik Bydgoski" to financial difficulties: in 1920, the newspaper was transformed into a joint-stock company, Drukarnia Bydgoska SA, with Jan Teska as its editor-in-chief. The daily paper was a voice of the Polish Christian democracy, but regularly leaned towards the National Democratic movement and Józef Piłsudski's Sanacja.

During interwar, "Dziennik Bydgoski" grew to become the most important daily newspaper in Bydgoszcz. Its print run progressed from 15,000 copies in early 1920 to 42,000 in 1929; at that time, the daily was the largest newspaper in western Poland, reaching the top ten daily newspapers in the country.

Wincentyna and Jan made several acquisitions during the interwar:

- in 1926, the Gazeta Gdańska, which they sold two years later to the state publishing house Gazeta Poznańska i Pomorska;
- in 1927, the daily Progress. They publishing it until 1934 under the calling Nowy Kurier;
- in 1928–1930, they owned part of the Warsaw daily Rzeczpospolita, then the main organ of the Christian Democracy in central Poland.

All these ventures were intended for the Teska to create a group of Christian-democratic newspapers: the attempt unfortunately failed. At the beginning of the 1930s, the couple left for Lviv and then stayed for some time in the Volhynia region.

When they came back to Bydgoszcz, Jan became an advisor to his son Lech, then an activist and editor of the paper "Odrodzenie" (English: Revival).

=== WWII ===
After the Invasion of Poland in September 1939, Teska left Bydgoszcz: Nazis forces destroyed the building of the editorial office and the printing house of the Dziennik Bydgoski.

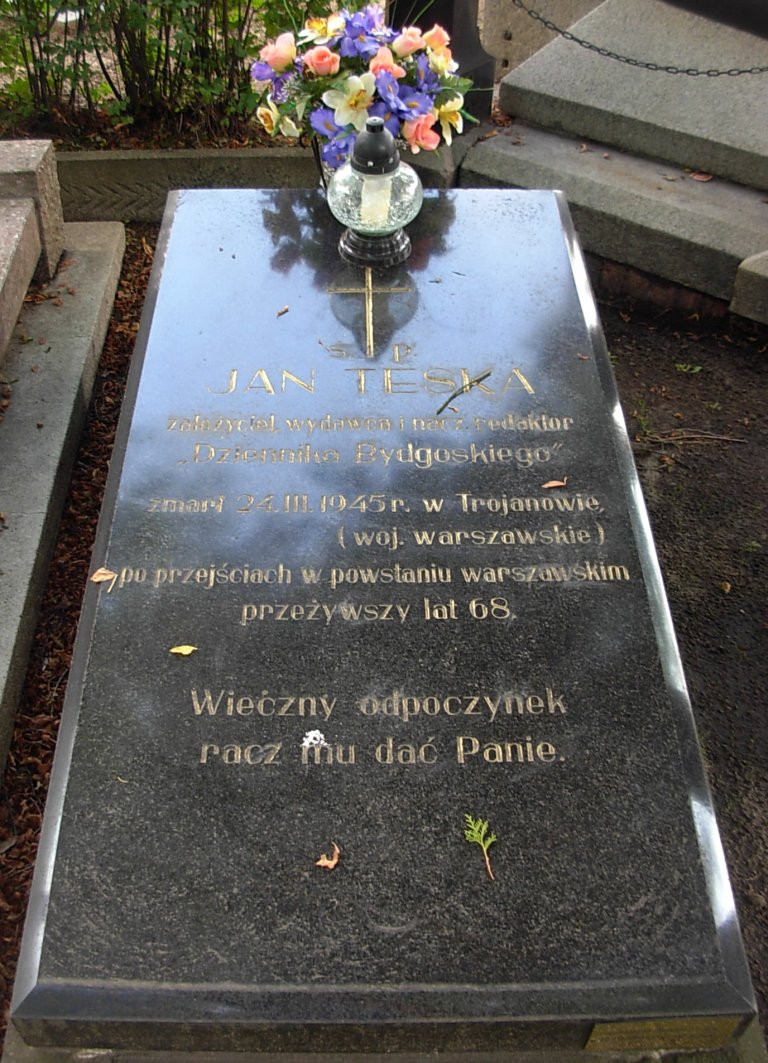
Jan Teska's tombstone in Bydgoszcz cemetery

Wanted by the Gestapo, he hid in Warsaw under the alias of "Józef Topolski" and entered the underground army. Having an excellent practice of German language, he took an active part in the "Operation N", mixing sabotage, subversion and black propaganda activities against the Wehrmacht.

Furthermore, Jan Teska actively participated in the activities of the underground Christian democratic political party Labour Faction (1937). He was a close associate of Zygmunt Felczak, who advocated cooperation with the socialist left and supported radical social changes in Poland. In July 1943, Felczak set up a separate group called Stronnictwo Zrywu Narodowy (English: National Rising Party) or "Zryw": Teska became its president.

In 1944, he participated in the Warsaw Uprising, in charge of the insurgent radio "Błyskawica". After the end of the uprising, he was sent to the transit camp (Durchgangslager or Dulag) 121 in Pruszków.

=== Post-war years ===
At the end of WWII, Teska was nominated by the Political Parties Consultation Commission (Polish: Centralna Komisja Porozumiewawcza Stronnictw Demokratycznych) created in November 1944, as a delegate to the Pomeranian Voivodeship National Council: there, he was representing the press and trade unions.

Unfortunately, Jan Teska died on 24 March 1945 in Trojanów near Sochaczew, before the inaugural meeting of this council. His body, interred in Sochaczew, was exhumed and reburied on 19 May 1945 at the Nowofarny Cemetery of Bydgoszcz.

== Political activity ==
His initial political views were significantly influenced by a group of activists of the bourgeois movement, gathered around the "Orędownik" magazine, where he worked from 1900.

Once editor of the "Dziennik Bydgoski", Jan Teska proclaimed, in line with his thoughts, that the newspaper would be "an outpost of national defense, a new fortification against the flood of Germans". He addressed his articles to the people, small merchants, craftsmen, workers, peasants and considered Prosperity to be the main driving force of social progress, achieved by the improvement of trade and industry.

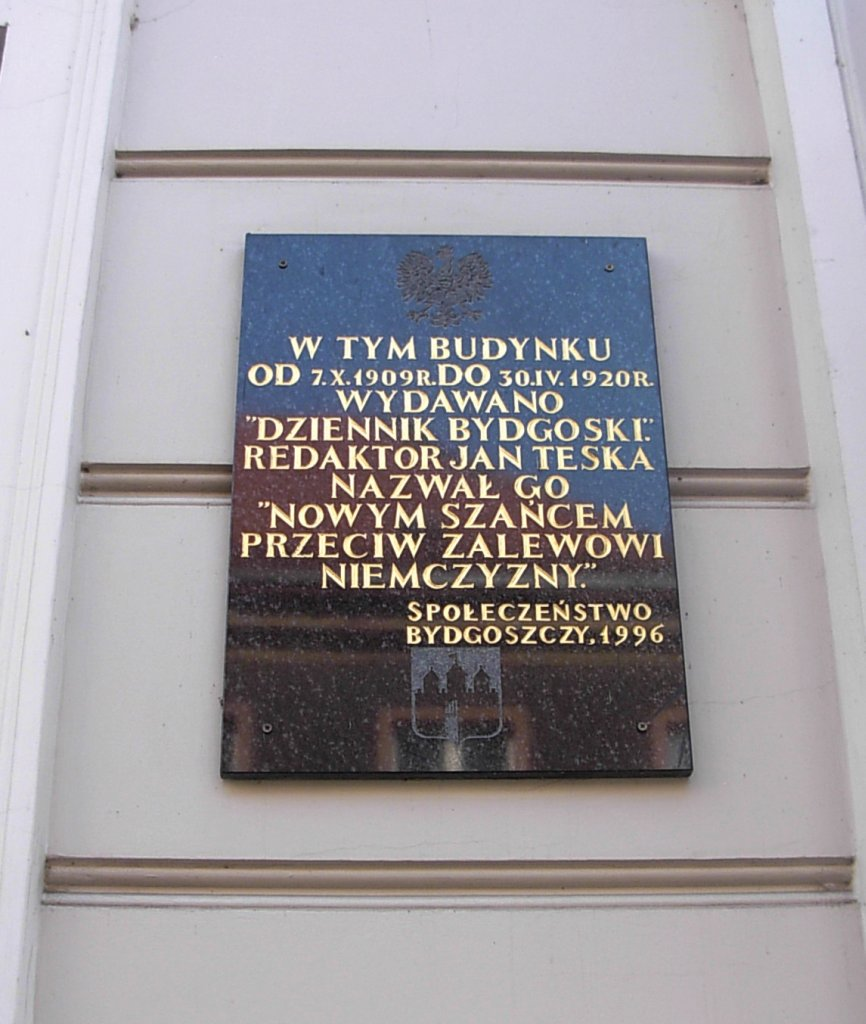
Plaque to honor Jan Teska

From 1905 onward, he actively cooperated with the "Guard" (Polish: Straża), a self-defense association in the Province of Posen. Teska also championed the creation of:

- a "National People's Party" branch in Bydgoszcz in 1911;
- a local "Związek Samopomocy Ludu Polskiego" (English: Self-defence Union of the Polish People) in 1913.

After World War I, Teska became permanently associated with the Christian-democratic movement and its rapid development in the region. In 1922, he was a co-organizer of the Christian Trade Unions in Bydgoszcz. Until the Second World War, Bydgoszcz Christian-democratic movement was the strongest political group in the city and in the 1930s it became the second most important Christian Democratic organization in Poland, after the Silesian organization.

The "Dziennik Bydgoski" was openly a support to the Christian Democracy, though Teska often opposed the tactics of its party's leaders. While he initially approved of the National Democracy (Polish: ND or Endecja), he then distanced himself from this movement.

After Józef Piłsudski's Coup, Jan Teska called for an agreement between the Christian Democracy and Piłsudski's Sanacja. At the end of 1935, he contributed to the establishment of the Christian Labor League in Bydgoszcz. He was hostile towards the anti-Piłsudski political coalition Centrolew and supported, between 1936 and 1938, the creation of a "united national front" gathering the right-wing National Party, the central National Workers' Party (NPR) and the center-left People's Party. Although this idea never came into existence, the merger of the Christian Democracy and the NPR indeed took place in October 1937.

During the interwar period, Jan Teska appeared as one of the leading Christian Democratic activists in Bydgoszcz, Poznań and Pomerania. In early 1938, he became a member of the Supreme Council of the Polish Christian Democratic Party (Polish: Stronnictwo Ludowe, SL) and in April, Teska was elected president of the Provincial Council of the SP in Pomerania.

== Personal life ==
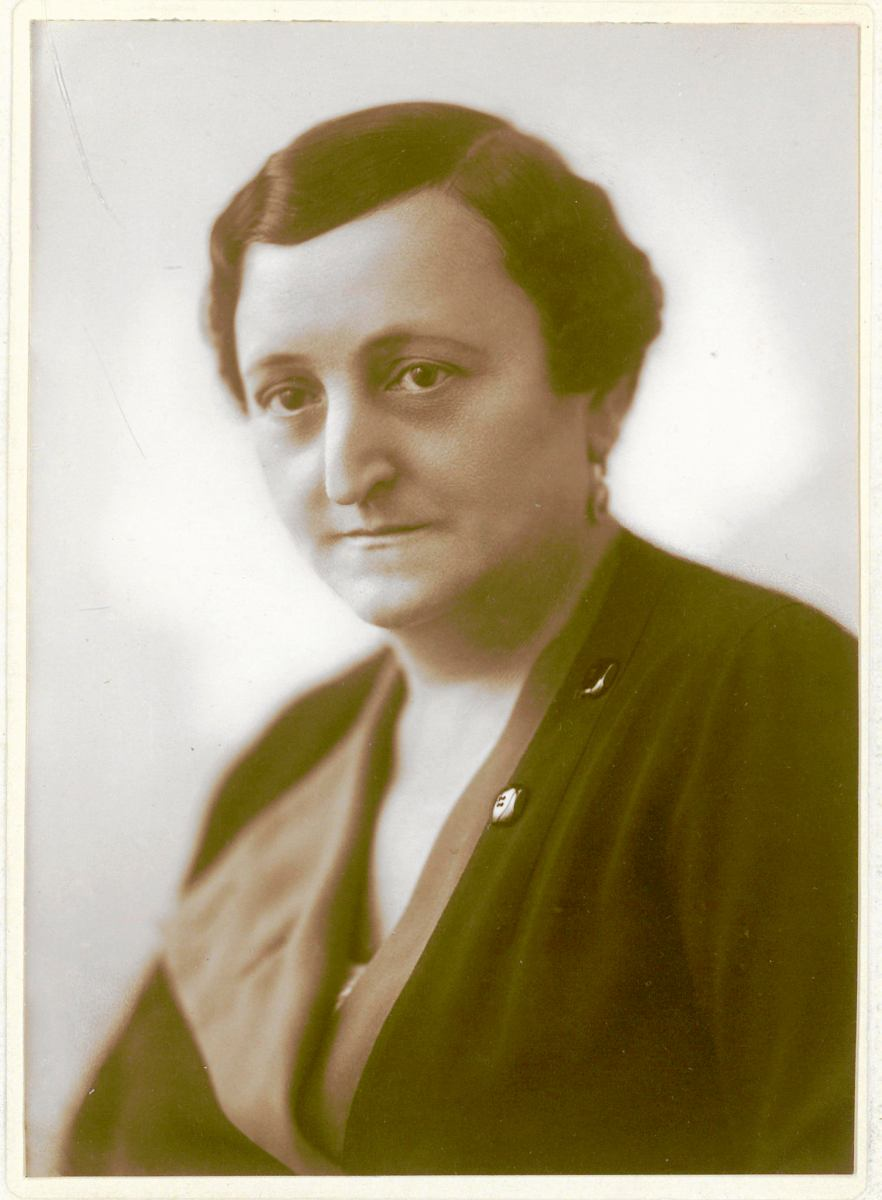
Wincentyna Teskowa

=== Wincentyna Teskowa ===
Jan Teska was married to Wincentyna, born on 29 September 1888 in Poznań from Wiktoria née Marszały and Wincenty Winiewicz, a worker. She and Teska married in 1905: she funded the publication of the first issues of "Dziennik Bydgoski" with the 4000 Marks of her wedding dowry. Until 1920, she used to manage the publishing house on her own when her husband was serving justice sentences for "insults to the Prussian authorities".

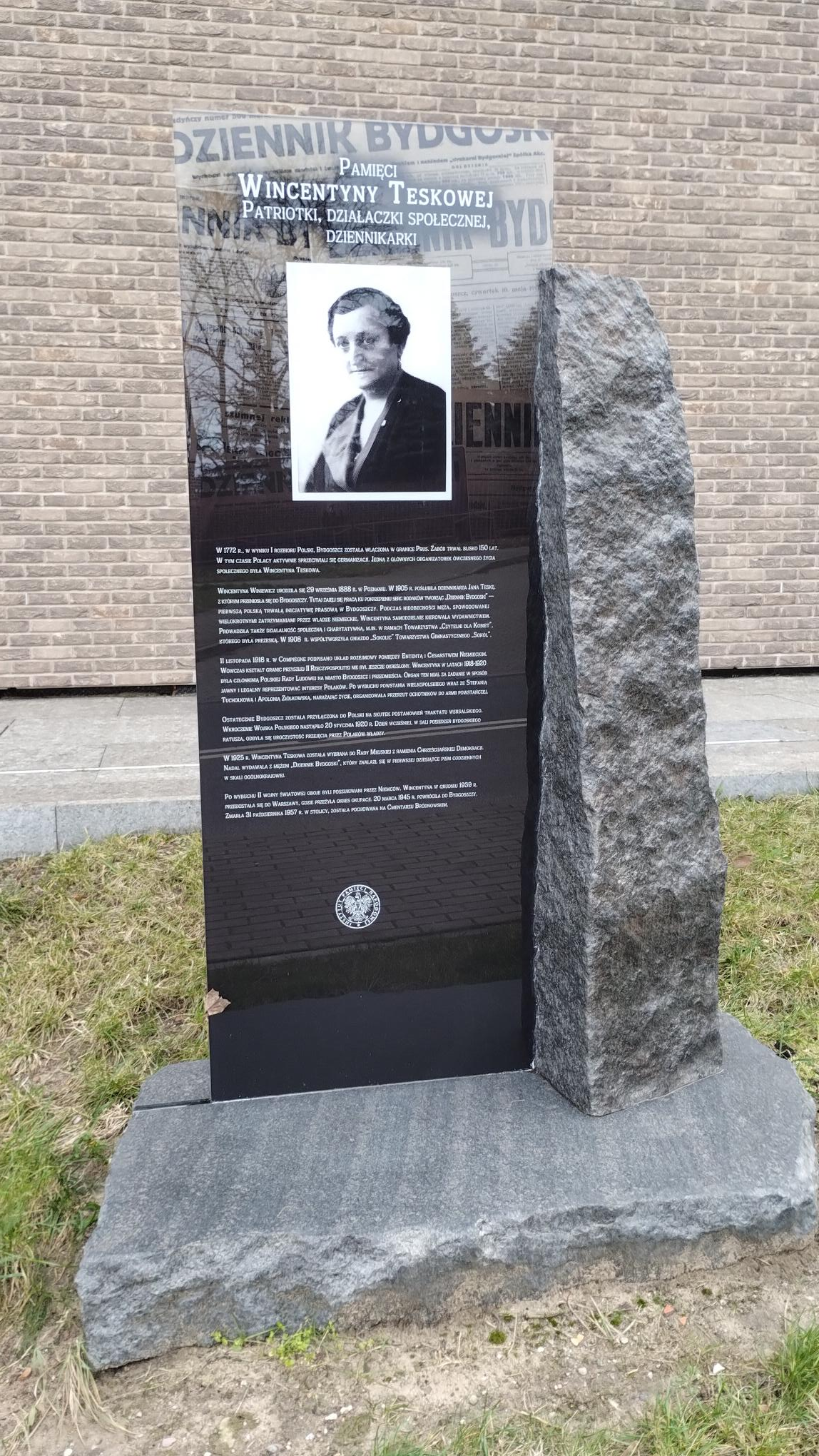
Wincenty Teskowa memorial in Bydgoszcz

During the First World War, Wincentyna performed the duties of the publishing house's administrator while cooperating with local female writers, Stefania Tuchołkowa and Alina Prus-Krzemińska. Her management proved to be successful, as "Dziennik Bydgoski" gained new readers during the war years.

Like Jan, Wincentyna was also active in social and charitable activities:

- from 1907 onward, she took part in the "Reading Rooms for Women" Society (Polish: Towarzystwo Czytelni dla Kobiet);
- in 1908, she co-founded the "Sokolic" club in Bydgoszcz;
- between 1918 and 1920, she was a member of the Polish People's Council of Bydgoszcz urban area;
- during the Greater Poland Uprising, together with Stefania Tuchołkowa and Apolonia Ziółkowska, she organized the passage of volunteers towards the insurgency.

On 27 November 1929 she was awarded the Officer's Cross of the Order of Polonia Restituta for her merits in the field of national, social and philanthropic works.

Politically aligned with her husband, she was associated with Christian Democrats: she was elected to the City Council in 1925 on their list. Despite this political position, Wincentyna refused in 1933 the proposal of Cardinal August Hlond, then Primate of Poland, to transform "Dziennik Bydgoski" into an organ of the Polish Catholic Action.

After the outbreak of World War II, the Teska couple was searched by the Germans. In December 1939, she moved to Warsaw, where she survived the rest of the war period. On 20 March 1945 she returned to Bydgoszcz and settled at 12 Poznańska street.

After the death of Jan, Wincentyna no longer participated in the city's social life; in autumn 1955, she moved to her son's, who had been living in the Polish capital since 1953.

She died on 31 October 1957 in Warsaw. She was buried at Bródno Cemetery (plot 112F-5-26).

Wincentyna and Jan Teska had a son, Lech Jan (born in 1906). The latter also worked as an editor and was known as an activist of Christian Democracy.

== Commemorations ==
- A street in Bydgoszcz, in the Fordon district, was named after Jan Teska.
- In 1996, a commemorative plaque to honor Jan Teska was placed on the wall of the former printing house of the "Dziennik Bydgoski", at 52 Długa Street in Bydgoszcz.
- On September 21, 2022, a commemorative plaque to Wincentyna Teskowa was unveiled on the building of the Delegation of the Institute of National Remembrance in Bydgoszcz.

== See also ==
- Bydgoszcz
- Zygmunt Felczak
- Jan Biziel
- List of Polish people

== Bibliography ==
- (in Polish) Błażejewski Stanisław, Kutta Janusz, Romaniuk Marek (1994). Bydgoski Słownik Biograficzny. Tom I. Bydgoszcz: Wojewódzki Ośrodek Kultury. p. 113. ISBN 8385327320.
- (in Polish) Jeleniewski, Marek K. (2012). Życie społeczno-polityczne XX-lecia międzywojennego w świetle polskiej prasy w Bydgoszczy. Bydgoszcz: Wydawnictwo Uniwersytetu Kazimierza Wielkiego. p. 113. ISBN 978-83-7096-869-4.
- (in Polish) Jeleniewski, Marek K. (2009). Wielojęzyczna bydgoska prasa lokalna do 1939 roku. Bydgoszcz : miasto wielu kultur i narodowości. Bydgoszcz: Przedsiębiorstwo Marketingowe Logo. pp. 199–215. ISBN 978-83-87586-98-0.
- (in Polish) Exhibition Wincentyna Teskowa (1888-1957), Anna Nadolska, Instytut Pamięci Narodowej, Bydgoszcz 2022.
