= Żuława, Lublin Voivodeship =

Żuława
- Village
- Location within Poland
- Coordinates: 51°48′35″N 23°18′9″E
- Country: Poland
- Voivodeship: Lublin
- County: Biała
- Gmina: Sosnówka

Żuława [ʐuˈwava] is a village in the administrative district of Gmina Sosnówka, within Biała County, Lublin Voivodeship, in eastern Poland.
