= Czeputka =

- Village
- Location within Poland
- Coordinates: 51°43′N 23°23′E
- Country: Poland
- Voivodeship: Lublin
- County: Biała
- Gmina: Sosnówka

Czeputka [t͡ʂɛˈputka] is a village in the administrative district of Gmina Sosnówka, within Biała County, Lublin Voivodeship, in eastern Poland.
