= Sapiehów =

- Village
- Location within Poland
- Coordinates: 51°48′N 23°20′E
- Country: Poland
- Voivodeship: Lublin
- County: Biała
- Gmina: Sosnówka

Sapiehów [saˈpʲɛxuf] is a village in the administrative district of Gmina Sosnówka, within Biała County, Lublin Voivodeship, in eastern Poland.
