= Sosnówka, Gmina Sosnówka =

Sosnówka
- Village
- Location within Poland
- Coordinates: 51°45′15″N 23°20′22″E
- Country: Poland
- Voivodeship: Lublin
- County: Biała
- Gmina: Sosnówka

Population
  - Total: 520

Sosnówka [sɔsˈnufka] is a village in Biała County, Lublin Voivodeship, in eastern Poland. It is the seat of the gmina (administrative district) called Gmina Sosnówka.

In 2005 the village had a population of 520.
