= Rozwadówka-Folwark =

- Village
- Location within Poland
- Coordinates: 51°45′31″N 23°16′6″E
- Country: Poland
- Voivodeship: Lublin
- County: Biała
- Gmina: Sosnówka

Rozwadówka-Folwark [rɔzvaˈdufka ˈfɔlvark] is a village in the administrative district of Gmina Sosnówka, within Biała County, Lublin Voivodeship, in eastern Poland.
