= Motwica =

- Village
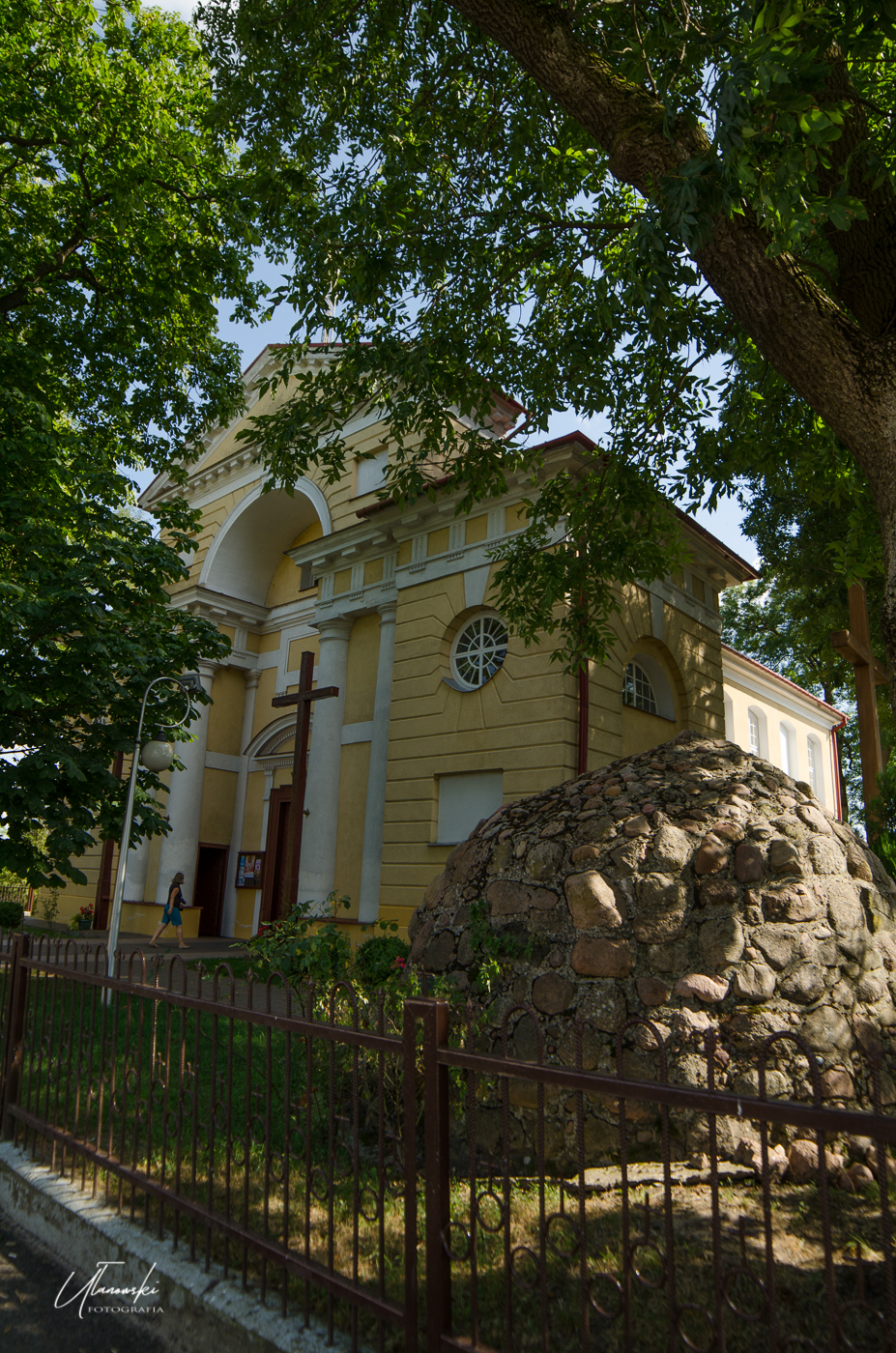
- Church in Motwica

- Location within Poland
- Coordinates: 51°43′11″N 23°19′22″E
- Country: Poland
- Voivodeship: Lublin
- County: Biała
- Gmina: Sosnówka
- Time zone: UTC+1 (CET)
  - Summer (DST): UTC+2 (CEST)

Motwica ([mɔtˈfʲit͡sa]) is a village in the administrative district of Gmina Sosnówka, within Biała County, Lublin Voivodeship, in eastern Poland.

== History ==
12 Polish citizens were murdered by Nazi Germany in the village during World War II.
