= Lipinki, Gmina Sosnówka =

Lipinki
- Village
- Location within Poland
- Coordinates: 51°47′N 23°24′E
- Country: Poland
- Voivodeship: Lublin
- County: Biała
- Gmina: Sosnówka
- Time zone: UTC+1 (CET)
  - Summer (DST): UTC+2 (CEST)

Lipinki [lʲiˈpʲiŋkʲi] is a village in the administrative district of Gmina Sosnówka, within Biała County, Lublin Voivodeship, in eastern Poland.

== History ==
Four Polish citizens were murdered by Nazi Germany in the village during World War II.
