= Żeszczynka =

- Village
- Location within Poland
- Coordinates: 51°47′50″N 23°18′06″E
- Country: Poland
- Voivodeship: Lublin
- County: Biała
- Gmina: Sosnówka

Population
  - Total: 299
- Website: http://www.zeszczynka.csd.pl

Żeszczynka [ʐɛˈʂt͡ʂɨŋka] is a village in the administrative district of Gmina Sosnówka, within Biała County, Lublin Voivodeship, in eastern Poland.
