= Omszana =

- Village
- Location within Poland
- Coordinates: 51°46′48″N 23°26′52″E
- Country: Poland
- Voivodeship: Lublin
- County: Biała
- Gmina: Sosnówka

Population
  - Total: 440

Omszana [ɔmˈʂana] is a village in the administrative district of Gmina Sosnówka, within Biała County, Lublin Voivodeship, in eastern Poland.
