= Wygnanka, Gmina Sosnówka =

Wygnanka
- Village
- Location within Poland
- Coordinates: 51°45′9″N 23°24′39″E
- Country: Poland
- Voivodeship: Lublin
- County: Biała
- Gmina: Sosnówka

Wygnanka [vɨɡˈnaŋka] is a village in the administrative district of Gmina Sosnówka, within Biała County, Lublin Voivodeship, in eastern Poland.
