= Dębów, Lublin Voivodeship =

Dębów
- Village
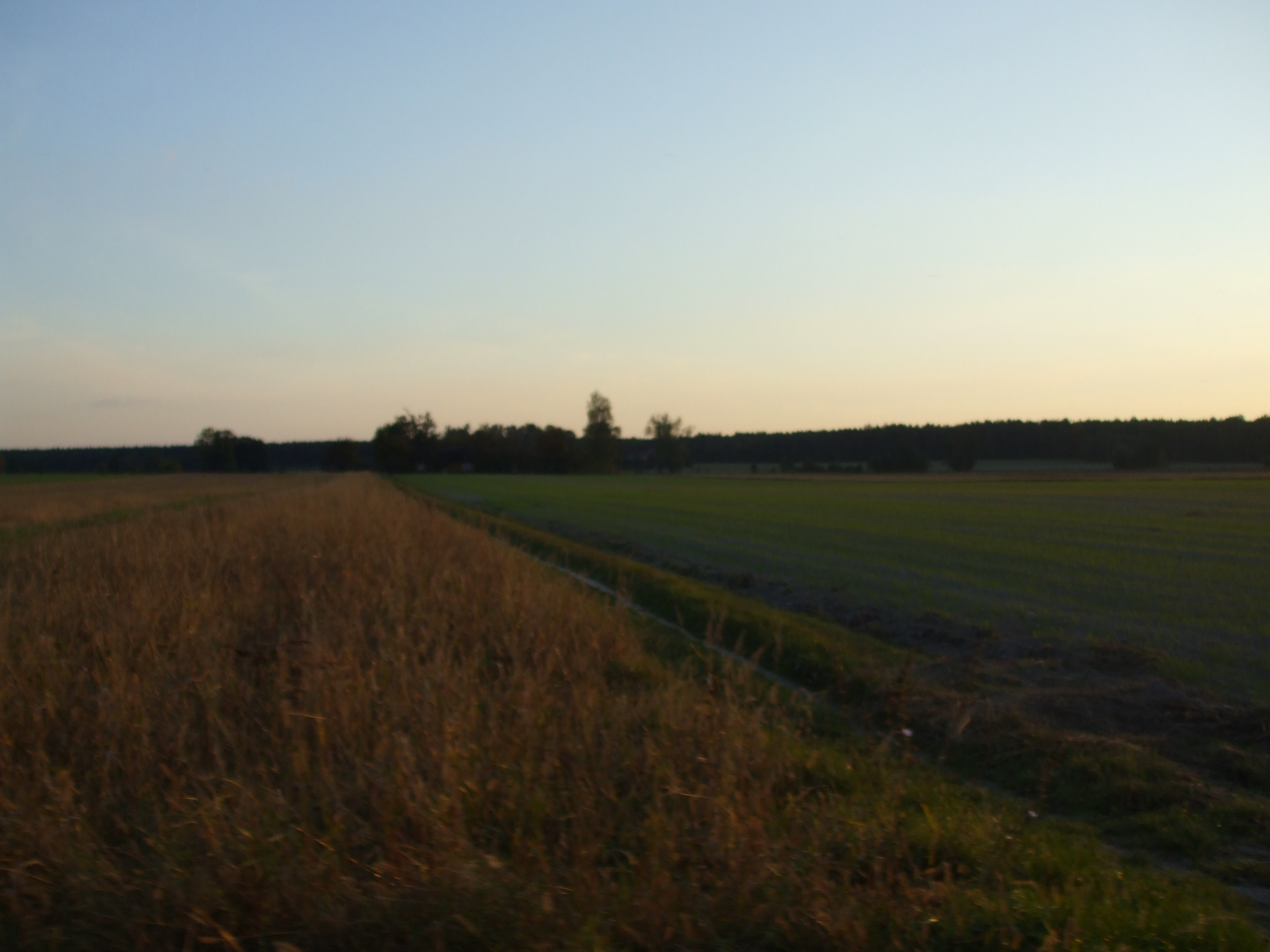

- Location within Poland
- Coordinates: 51°41′15″N 23°19′7″E
- Country: Poland
- Voivodeship: Lublin
- County: Biała
- Gmina: Sosnówka
- Time zone: UTC+1 (CET)
  - Summer (DST): UTC+2 (CEST)

Dębów [ˈdɛmbuf] is a village in the administrative district of Gmina Sosnówka, within Biała County, Lublin Voivodeship, in eastern Poland.

== History ==
Six Polish citizens were murdered by Nazi Germany in the village during World War II.
