= Hermann Dietz =

Physician, social activist in Bydgoszcz, Poland (1861–1944)

Hermann Ernest Georg Dietz
- Born: November 13, 1861; Bromberg, Kingdom of Prussia
- Died: February 21, 1944 (aged 82); Bromberg, Poland
- Occupations: physician, social activist
- Years active: 1900s-1940s

Hermann Ernest Georg Dietz, generally called Hermann Dietz, (1861–1944) was a German physician, a member of the Bromberg city council, a senator of the Republic of Poland and a prominent social activist in the first half of the 20th century in Bromberg/Bydgoszcz.

== Biography ==
=== Prussian period ===
The Dietz ancestors were German colonists who established in the city after the First Partition of Poland in 1772. The family branch in Bydgoszcz relates also to Heinrich Dietz (1840–1901), a Prussian rentier, member of the Bromberg city council, member of the Prussian parliament and a prominent philanthropist.

Hermann was born on November 13, 1861, in Poznań. He was the son of Hermann Theodor Dietz, a restaurateur in Bromberg at 12 Schloss Straße (today's Grodzka Street). After graduating from medical studies in the 1890s, he opened a private medical practice at 17 Linden straße (today's Lipowa street) and at the same time started working in a railway outpatient clinic. Within ten years, Dietz made himself known as one of the best medicine specialists in town.

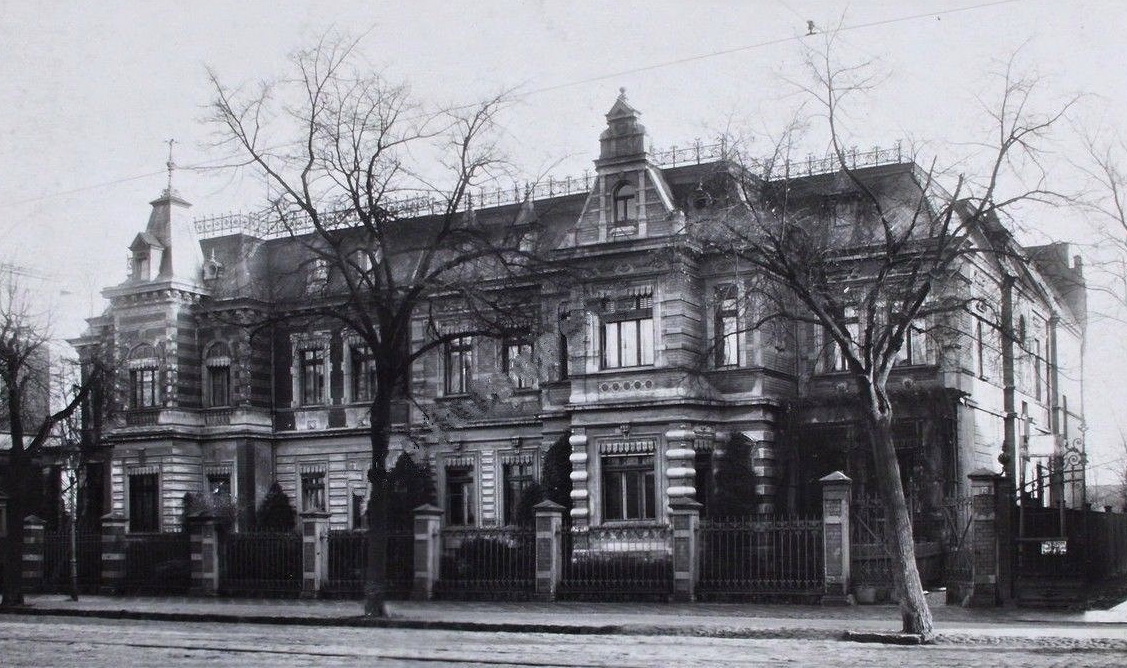
Dietz house at 88-90 Gdańska street ca 1900

Hermann married Sophie Welle, the widow of a wealthy mill owner. Thanks to her money, he could achieve financial independence and was quickly considered one of the richest citizens of Bromberg. As such, in 1904, he was able to buy an automobile for his private use, a real novelty in the city at the time. While he gave up his tiring activity at the clinic for railwaymen, he moved his private practice downtown at 88-90 Gdańska Street and set up as well a small sanatorium in the suburban village of Rynkowo (now a district of Bydgoszcz).

At the time of the German Empire (1871–1918), Dietz was very active in politics. He was a city councilor and vice-chairman of the City Council. After World War I, he became involved in activities to keep Bydgoszcz within German territory: he was then one of the most energetic activists in the city. However, Hermann had never shown any anti-Polish behaviour and never attacked verbally (let alone physically) the Polish minority of Bromberg/Bydgoszcz.

=== Interwar period ===
Though the signature of the Treaty of Versailles endorsed the return of Bydgoszcz to the reborn Polish nation, Hermann Dietz decided to stay in the city. On January 19, 1920, he sided with Hugo Wolff, the German mayor, to take part in the ceremony handing over the municipal authority to Jan Maciaszek, the new city magistrate appointed by the Polish government.

Although the transfer of power went smoothly, the atmosphere in the city was tense. In this situation, the new city council, afraid of riots, took the decision to preventively isolate some of the most active German leaders. Hence, the 60-year-old doctor Hermann Dietz wound up in Poznań citadel, jailed for three months.

At his return, Dietz resumed his political activity in German minority organizations, defending its rights: he was being considered anew one of the leaders of the German citizens in Bydgoszcz. During the interwar period, he also gained a great respect among Poles, distinguishing himself by a favorable attitude towards them, whenever the tensions arose, with conflicts and disputes between both nationalities being a daily business. Hermann opposed at court another German, Maksymilian Neumann. The latter, living at Kosciuszko street, addressed sick Poles in his tenement whom the doctor visited as "[...] dogs to (let) die". After having been reported by neighbourgs, the case against H. Dietz was judged in the spring of 1939: Neumann was sentenced to six months in prison.

=== World War II ===
During the Bydgoszcz Bloody Sunday episode which started on September 3, 1939, Dietz hid in the basement of his own tenement house. Discovered by Polish soldiers looking for saboteurs, he was protected from arrest thanks to the intervention of a Polish coachman who vouched for him: the 78-year-old man was left alone.

A few days later the situation changed and the Germans started shooting the Poles, but Dietz intervened in their defence. He even had his neighbours, family of the industrialist Stanisław Rolbieski, murdered by the Nazi forces. Although he was regularly vocal in his critics upon Nazism, he was nevertheless received in 1941 by the German city authorities for a ceremony celebrating his 80th birthday. He died three years later, on February 21, 1944, and was buried in the Evangelical cemetery then located at Jagiellońska street: in 1945, the cemetery was closed and transferred to the Lutheran cemetery in Zaświat Street.

In 2018, the Evangelical parish renovated most of the tombstones, including Hermann Dietz's.

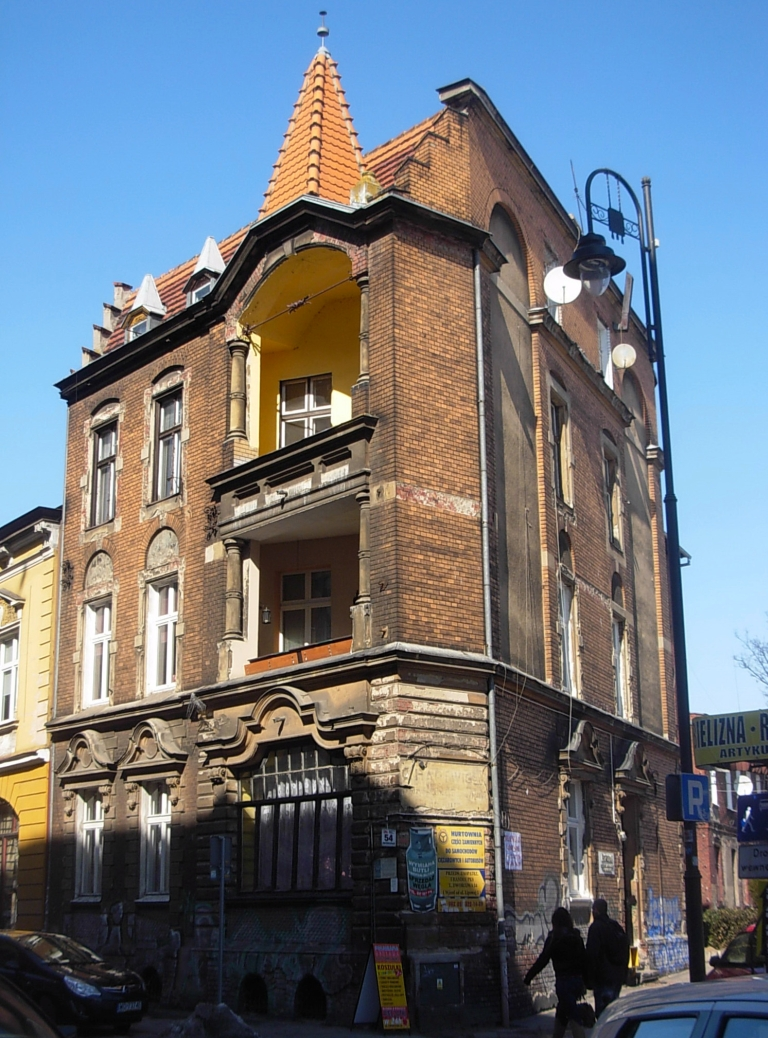
Ancient shelter at 54 Dworcowa

Among his children, Herma Dietz (born in 1919) married Walter Sontheimer, a school headmaster. Their son, Prof. Dr. Günther-Dietz Sontheimer (1934–1992), was a scholar in indology.

== Social activities ==
During World War I, Hermann Dietz together with Elimar Schendell and other doctors organized nursing courses at the "Auguste-Viktoria-Heim" (today's Kuyavia Pomerania Cultural Centre at 6 Kościelecki Square), where young infants were coming not only from Bromberg city but also from other regions. Around 130 patients were cared for each year and the institution had set up there a clinic for young mothers.

After his return from arrest in 1920, Dr. Dietz kept on working in his private practice at 123 Gdańska street. He also operated two shelters for the poors, the first at 54-57a Dworcowa Street and the second in Szwederowo district, at 5 Dąbrowskiego street. With such actions, he gained a good reputation among Poles: he helped the poor, healed them for free and often provided medicines. He was particularly well known among the new displaced citizens coming from the Eastern Borderlands.

Despite his elderly age during WWII, Dietz provided critical assistance to Poles, an activity which was very uncommon in a difficult time for the Polish community. He nursed numerous sick patients until his death in 1944, traveling to them in a black carriage with a shed.

== See also ==
- Bydgoszcz
- Hermann's Dietz house
- Heinrich Dietz
- List of Polish people

== Bibliography ==
- (in Polish) Jastrzębski, Włodzimierz (2000). Hermann Ernst Georg Dietz (1861-1944). Bydgoszczanie XX wieku. Bydgoszcz: Bydgoszcz : Instytut Wydawniczy "Świadectwo", 2000. pp. 38–41. ISBN 8387531286.
- (in Polish) Czarnowski, Władysław (1969). Ze wspomnień starego Bydgoszczanina. Poznań: Wydawnicza Poznańskie. pp. 147–162.
