= Miłość Nie Wyklucza =

Polish LGBT+ advocacy organization

Stowarzyszenie Milość Nie Wyklucza (MNW) (English: Love Does Not Exclude Association) is a non-governmental organization that works to bring marriage equality to same-sex couples and to build the LGBT+ community in Poland.

As an informal group it was founded in Warsaw in 2009. Miłość Nie Wyklucza has been conducting informational, educational and lobbying activities for the introduction of civil partnerships for same-sex and different-sex couples in Poland. In 2013, already as a registered association, MNW became the first Polish LGBT+ organization advocating for full marriage equality for same-sex couples.

The main areas of the association's activities are:

- educating and informing the public on marriage equality, including the negative consequences of the lack of regulation of the situation of same-sex couples in Polish law, and proposed solutions,
- building the Polish LGBT+ community through information, networking, exchange of knowledge and experience, and mutual support of organizations and individuals from the community,
- monitoring and political lobbying for the implementation of the association's strategic goal - the introduction in Poland of full marriage equality for same-sex couples.

== Social campaign Miłość Nie Wyklucza ==
The founding activity of the organization was the nationwide social campaign Miłość Nie Wyklucza conducted in 2010-2011. Posters and billboards of the campaign, presenting single-sex couples, appeared in several cities across the country, and the topic of civil partnerships appeared in local and national media. Apart from photos of adult homosexuals, the campaign materials also used photos of them when they were children, which aroused controversy. Under the children's photos there was a caption: "When they grow up they will not have equal rights."

== Laws on civil partnerships ==
In 2011-2012, the representation of Miłość Nie Wyklucza participated in the work on two draft laws on civil partnerships submitted to the Parliament by the Democratic Left Alliance and the Palikot Movement. The drafts took into account the results of an online survey of the needs of the Polish LGBT+ community conducted by the MNW, according to which interested persons expected the introduction of the broadest possible provisions on legal protection and care for couples.

Lobbying activities were accompanied by a social campaign "W związku z miłością" aimed at engaging supporters of the idea of civil partnership. The fanpage of the campaign collected photos sent by heterosexual and LGBT+ persons, both couples and families with children, as well as individuals, who in this way demonstrated their support for the idea of introducing the institution of civil unions in Poland. Events were also held in several cities, at which photos from the campaign were displayed, showing same-sex and different-sex couples waiting for the opportunity to enter into such a union.

Throughout the period when the bills were "lying dormant" in the Sejm, the group Love Does Not Exclude organized demonstrations ("picnics") in front of the parliament building to remind deputies about this issue. Letters were also sent to the then Speaker of the Sejm Ewa Kopacz and information materials to all parliamentarians.

== The "Marriage Equality for All" Project ==
In 2014, the MNW informal group transformed into an association, taking as its goal full marriage equality, or equal rights for same-sex and different-sex unions. As part of the "Marriage Equality for All" project implemented in 2015-2016, a number of educational and lobbying activities were conducted. The Love Does Not Exclude Association:

- initiated the Coalition for Partnerships and Marriage Equality, bringing together NGOs and law firms. The Coalition's goal is to carry out a strategic litigation process, as a result of which the case of five Polish same-sex couples, who cannot formalize their relationships in Poland, will be reviewed by the European Court of Human Rights in Strasbourg;
- conducted the first nationwide quantitative study of attitudes toward marriage equality, as well as quantitative and qualitative research on the LGBT+ community;
- published the first publication in Poland on marriage equality: "Marriage Equality. A Guide for Beginners";
- developed the "Strategy for the introduction of marriage equality in Poland for 2016-2025" - a framework document setting out the strategic goals of the Association and its allies.

== "Love Me, Mom and Dad" campaign ==
In March 2021, the association, together with the organizations Stonewall Group, Kultura Równości, and Tolerado also working for the rights of LGBT+ persons, organized an educational campaign combined with an online fund-raising for a billboard campaign as part of the campaign and for aid activities for young LGBT+ persons. The author of the graphics used in the campaign and its originator was the cartoonist Karolina "Szarosen" Plewińska. Billboards that were part of the campaign appeared in 266 locations in Poland, drawing the attention of local media. More than 713 thousand zlotys were collected as part of the fundraising. Of which the first 590 thousand during the first two days of the collection.

== Building the LGBT+ community in Poland ==
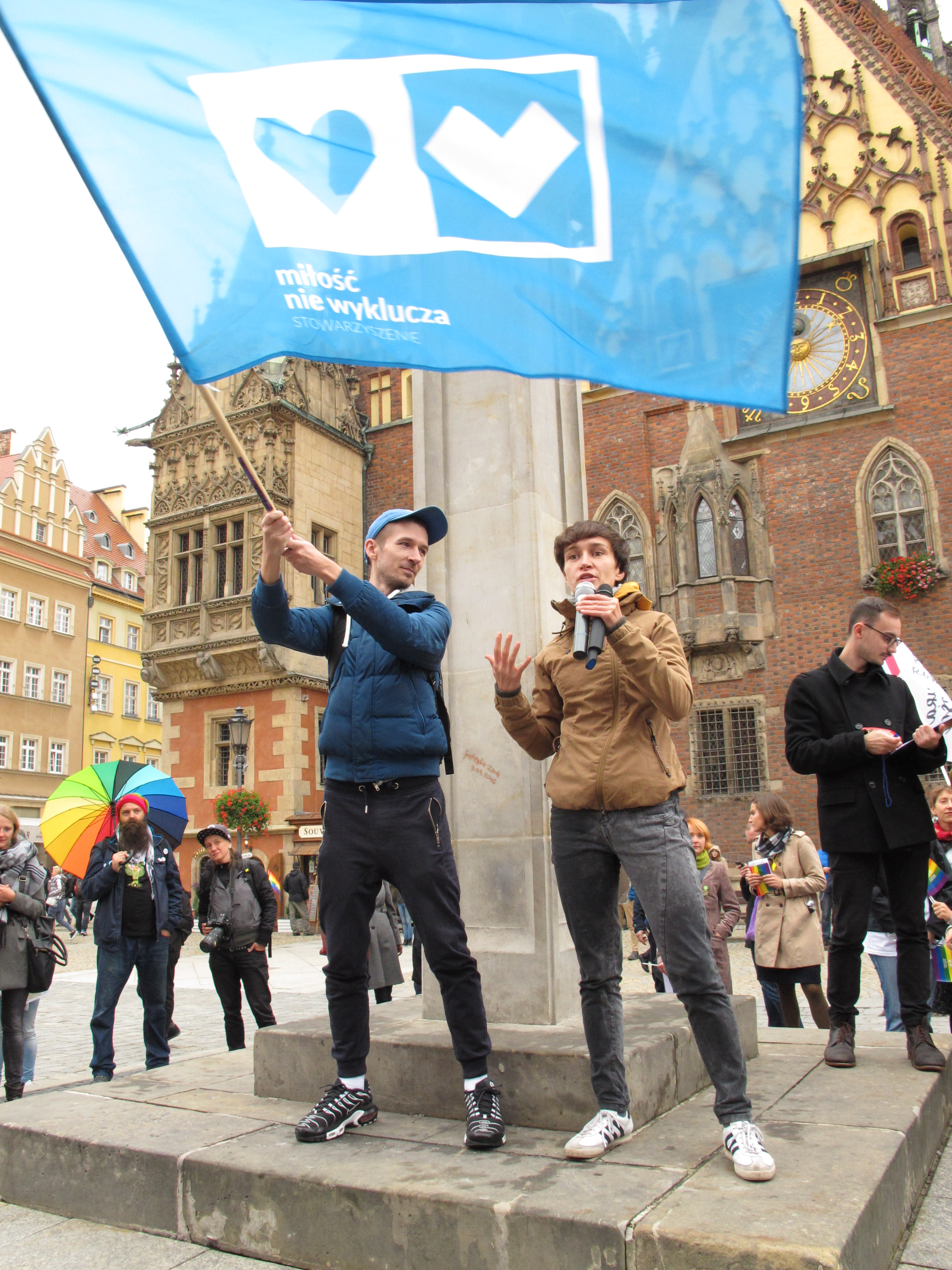
The Love Does Not Exclude Association at the Equality March in Wroclaw (2016)

One of the priority areas of the Association's activity is strengthening the community of non-heteronormative people in Poland. This goal is realized, among others, through:

- permanent presence in social media such as Facebook, Twitter, Instagram and Snapchat. More than 35 thousand fans make the Love Does Not Exclude fanpage the largest page devoted to LGBT+ issues on Polish Facebook;
- promotion of participation in marches and demonstrations. Both those directly concerning LGBT+ people, as well as others, such as women's and human rights;
- strengthening cooperation with other LGBT+ organizations in Poland with a particular emphasis on intercity cooperation;
- organization and participation of persons from the Association in cultural and social events;
- responding to cases of homophobia and transphobia in public discourse;
- maintaining the presence of the topic of marriage equality in the media.

== Publications ==
- Postawy wobec równości małżeńskiej w Polsce, Warszawa: Stowarzyszenie Miłość Nie Wyklucza, 2015, ISBN 978-83-942455-2-8
- Polska społeczność nieheteronormatywna, Warszawa: Stowarzyszenie Miłość Nie Wyklucza, 2015, ISBN 978-83-942455-2-8
- Społeczność LGBTQIA w Polsce, Warszawa: Stowarzyszenie Miłość Nie Wyklucza, 2015, ISBN 978-83-942455-2-8
- Równość małżeńska. Przewodnik dla początkujących. Warszawa: Stowarzyszenie Miłość Nie Wyklucza, 2016, ISBN 978-83-942455-1-1
- Strategia wprowadzenia równości małżeńskiej w Polsce na lata 2016–2025, Warszawa: Stowarzyszenie Miłość Nie Wyklucza, 2016
