= Aleksander Jędrzejewski =

Polish painter

- Born: 14 September 1903; Zhytomyr, Russian Empire
- Died: 28 August 1974 (aged 70); Wrocław, Poland
- Occupation: Painter

Aleksander Jędrzejewski (14 September 1903 – 28 August 1974) was a Polish painter. His work was part of the painting event in the art competition at the 1936 Summer Olympics.
