= Ryszard Markwart =

German-Polish catholic priest and Polish national activist (1868–1906)

Father Ryszard Markwart
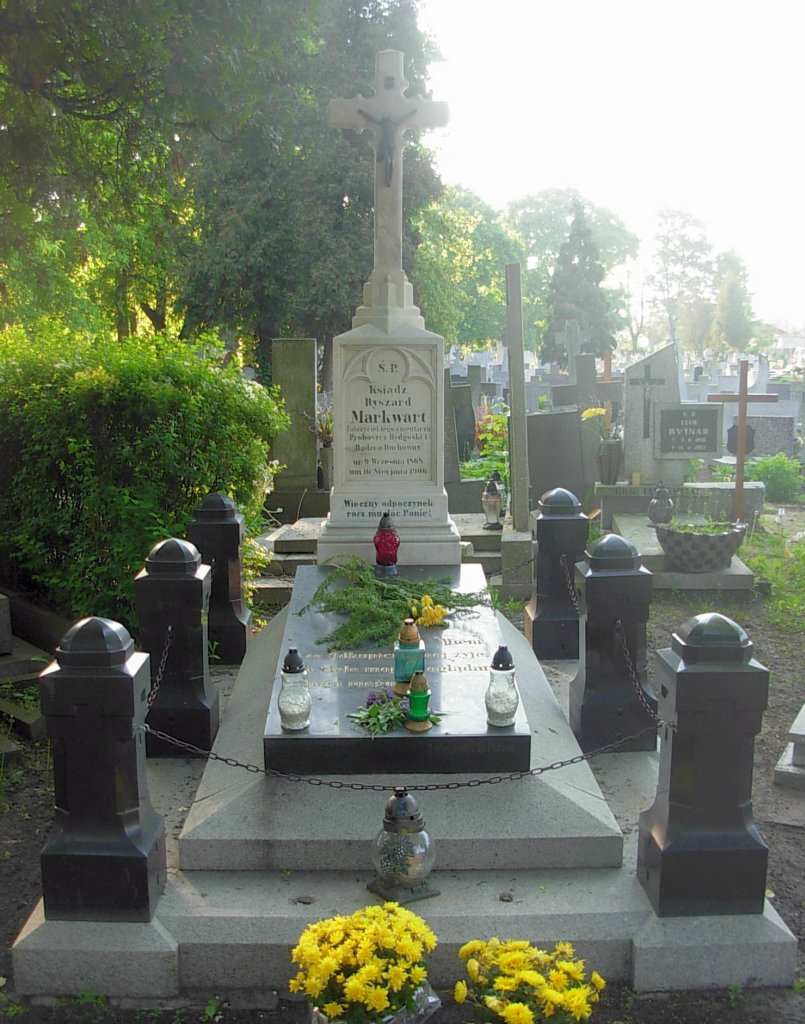
- Father Markwart tombstone, Bydgoszcz
- Born: 9 September 1868; Ostróda, German Empire
- Died: 16 August 1906 (aged 37); Międzyzdroje, German Empire
- Burial place: Nowofarny cemetery, Bydgoszcz
- Occupation: Priest
- Religion: Catholic Church
- Church: Latin Church

Ryszard Markwart, or Richard Marquardt (1868-1906) was a German-Polish Catholic priest and Polish national activist who served in Magdeburg, Berlin and Bydgoszcz.

== Early life and occupations ==
Richard Marquardt was born on 9 September 1868 in Ostróda, then part of the German Empire, from a Polish-German family.

His father was a German of the Evangelical faith and worked as a veterinarian. His mother Norberta was a Polish Roman Catholic woman. She had the most influence on Ryszard and was critical to shape her son's attachment to Polishness and Catholic faith.

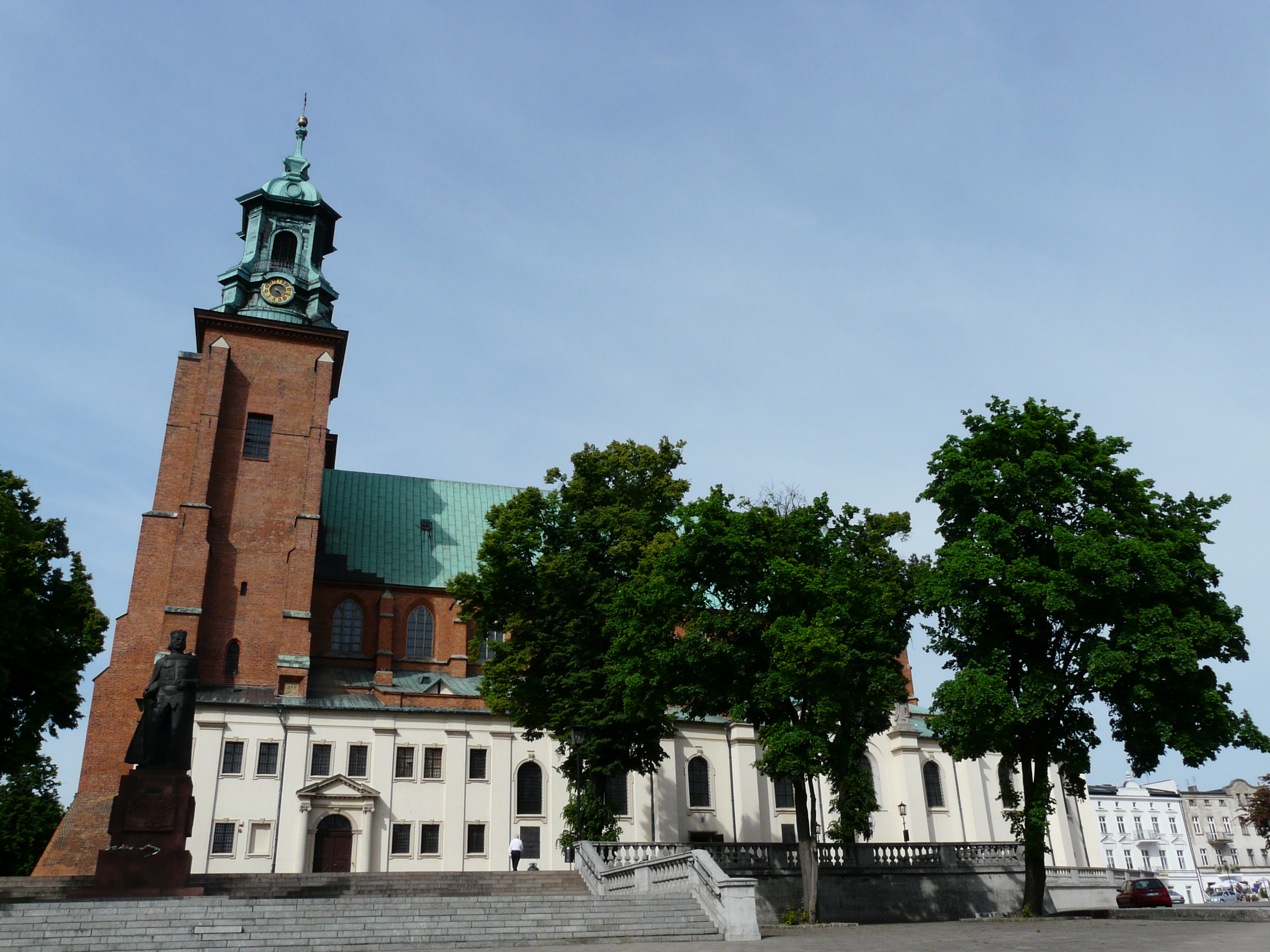
Gniezno Cathedral

After graduating from gymnasium, he attended lectures at different universities:

- Greifswald;
- Würzburg;
- Münster.

Furthermore, Markwart was educated in theological seminaries in Poznań and Gniezno. He finally received ordination in Gniezno.

He was first a "manservant" "(Polish: mansjonarz)", i.e. below the rank of priest in the hierarchy of the Catholic Church, in Środa Wielkopolska during two years (1892–1894). Ryszard then became a vicar at the Gniezno Cathedral.

Between 1894 and 1899, he worked as a priest in the German imperial army. He transferred as parish priest to the garrison church in Magdeburg, then moved as the military chaplain of the 7th division, billeted in Berlin.

During this period, he permanently showed support to Polish national activities, in particular by actively participating in meetings and happenings organised by Polish organizations in Berlin. Concurrently, Markwart expressed tactfulness towards German Catholics, gaining also their sympathy.

== Activities in Bydgoszcz ==
In 1899, the parish church in Bydgoszcz lost his priest, Father Józef Choraszewski. To replace him, Florian Stablewski, the serving archbishop of Gniezno, supported Markwart candidacy for the position of parson of the only catholic parish of Bromberg.

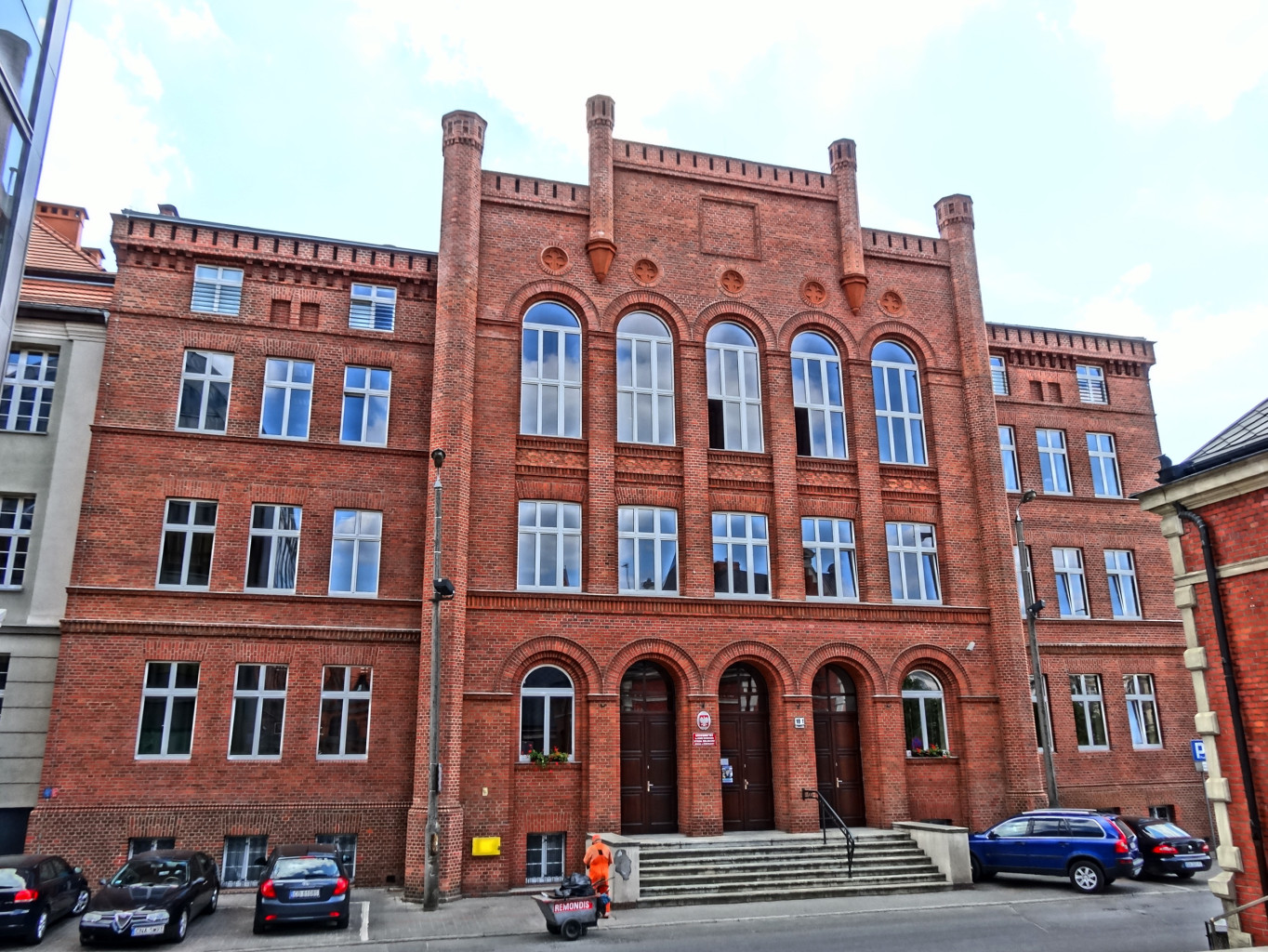
Old town realschule

With the tacit agreement of the German authorities, Ryszard Markwart was nominated to this place on 15 November 1899. As the parish priest of Bydgoszcz, he taught religion in the two existing realschules of the city: in downtown (today's High School Nr.1) and in the old town (today's High Seminary of Bydgoszcz Diocese at 18 Grodzka Street).

Like his predecessor Józef Choraszewski, Father Markwart faced constant challenges to provide pastoral care in his vast and populous parish. To overcome the issue, he constantly leveraged to have another church built in his city. The project designed by architect Roger Sławski will be eventually carried out in autumn 1912: the Church of the Holy Trinity was consecrated on 18 May 1913 by Gniezno suffragan bishop Wilhelm Kloske.

In 1904, the archbishop of Gniezno granted him the title of "honorary clerical counselor".

In 1906, he founded the Nowofarny Cemetery at Artyleryjska Street, since the old cemetery (Starofarny Cemetery) had reached its full capacity.

To improve his health, Ryszard Markwart went to the health resort of Międzyzdroje on the Baltic Sea, where he died on 16 August 1906, while swimming. He was buried at the Nowofarny Cemetery, in a ceremony attended by a multitude of Polish inhabitants of Bydgoszcz and its surroundings.

== Polish activist ==
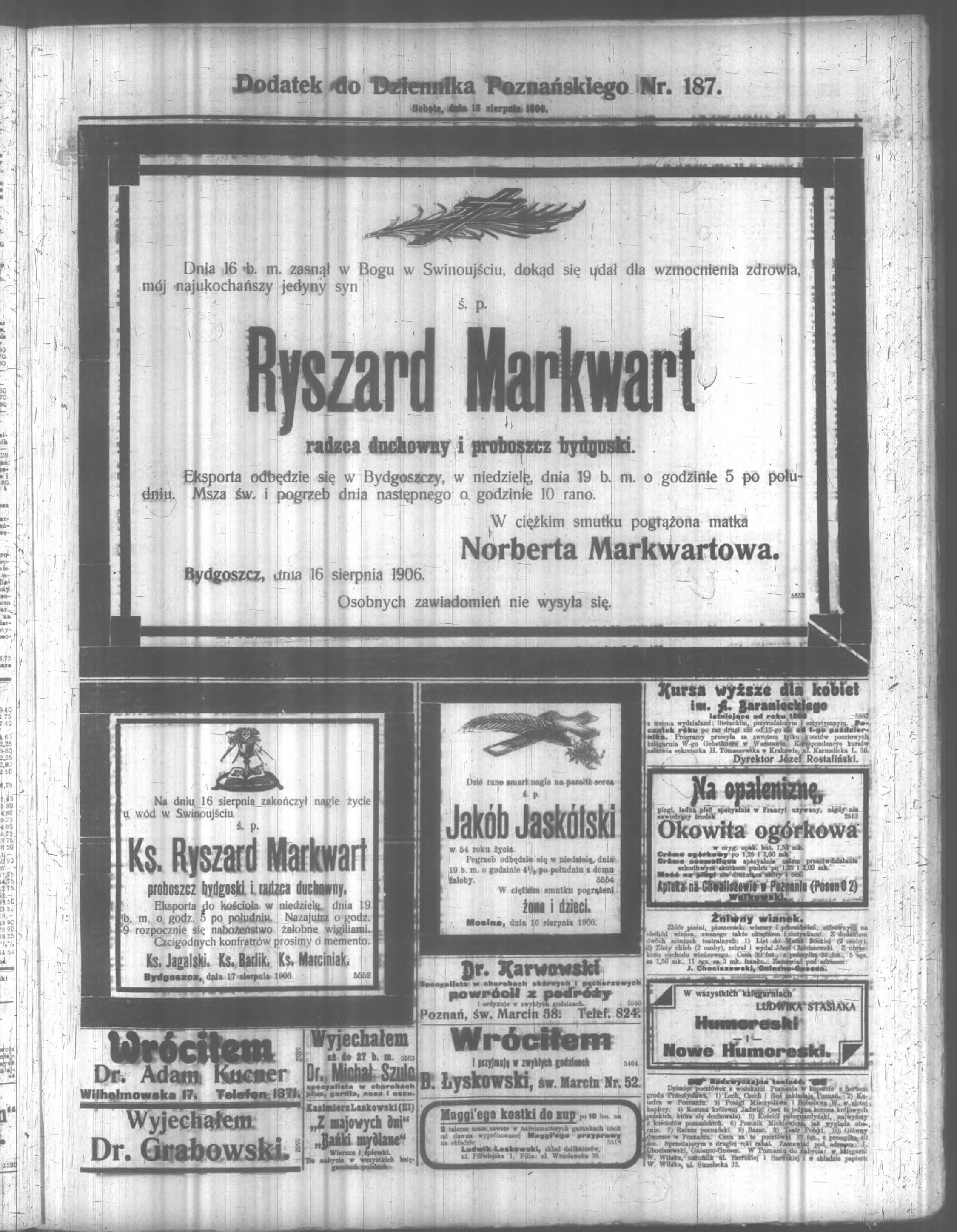
R. Markwart funerals in "Dziennik Poznański 1906"

In addition to his minister work, he additionally supervised the religious and charity associations of the parish. In particular, Ryszard Markwart took extra care of the "Polish-Catholic Workers' Society" (Polish: Towarzystwo Robotników Polsko-Katolickich), reactivated in 1892, which championed patriotism and Polish culture. Under his patronage, the institution joined the "Union of Workers' Societies" (Polish: Związek Robotników Polskich) in 1904 in Poznań. The Polish-Catholic Workers' Society had a rich library, allowing to promote the Polish language among Bydgoszcz inhabitants. It distributed the Polish press, conducted lively lecture activities and provided Polish catechism and historical story books to children from poor families.

Feeling deep attachments to his mother Polish roots he had changed his birth name Richard Marquardt to Ryszard Markwart.

Actually, he combined the pastoral work with a dynamic support to national activities among Polish inhabitants. In this matter, he became in 1905 a member of the Bydgoszcz board of the "K. Marcinkowski Society for Scientific Support", established in 1841 by Marcinkowski and Maciej Mielżyński in Prussian occupied Poland. Additionally he participated to the "Straż" organization, which opposed the Germanisation policy of the ruling authorities.

This national activism aroused suspicion then opposition from German nationalists. They informed the institutions of the Bromberg region, claiming falsely that Father Markwart defied the law by teaching religion lessons in Polish. In parallel, German Catholics in Bromberg, having been denied by Ryszard the possibility to create a separate parish church, asked for his departure from the city in 1904. However these slanders and other requests did not reach any result, in particular because of Markwart unexpected death.

== Recognitions ==
After 1920, a street in Bydgoszcz Śródmieście district was named after him.

== See also ==
- Bydgoszcz
- Bydgoszcz Cathedral
- Church of the Holy Trinity, Bydgoszcz
- Markwarta street in Bydgoszcz
- List of Polish people
- Starofarny Cemetery in Bydgoszcz

== Bibliography ==
- (in Polish) Błażejewski Stanisław, Kutta Janusz, Romaniuk Marek (1995). Bydgoski Słownik Biograficzny. Tom II. Bydgoszcz: Kujawsko-Pomorskie Towarzystwo Kulturalne Wojewódzki Ośrodek Kultury. pp. 100–101. ISBN 8385327274.
