= Teofil Magdziński =

Polish lawyer, politician, national activist (1818–1889)

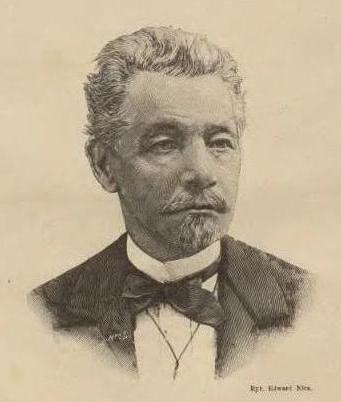
- Teofil Magdziński
- Born: 13 October 1818; Szamotuły, Grand Duchy of Posen, Prussia
- Died: 1 February 1889 (aged 70); Zbąszyń, German Empire
- Resting place: Starofarny Cemetery, Bydgoszcz
- Occupations: Lawyer, politician, national activist

Teofil Magdziński (13 October 1818 – 1 February 1889) was a Polish lawyer, conspirator and activist in exile. He participated in several Polish uprisings of the second half of the 19th century. He was one of the most prominent politicians in Bydgoszcz, representative at the Reichstag and a staunch defender of Polishness.

== Biography ==
=== Early life ===
Teofil Magdziński was born in the city of Samter (present day's Szamotuły), then in the Grand Duchy of Posen, on 13 October 1818. His mother was Nepomucena née Halicka and his father Jan, a postmaster.

Between 1827 and 1834, he attended the secondary school in Poznań, at the Saint Mary Magdalene gymnasium. In 1835, he studied in parallel -as a free student- at the Philosophy Faculty of the University of Wrocław.

After passing his secondary school examination (Abitur), he decided to turn to Law, but after a few months he was removed from the list of students. In Wrocław, Teofil was the co-founder and member of the Literary and Slavic Society.

He moved to other universities to pursue his law studies, in Berlin and Leipzig. In both places he was an active member of the "Polish Students' Clubs".

=== Underground activity ===
After faculty graduation, Magdziński worked in the judiciary domain in Berlin and in Poznań. It was also the time during which he completed his military service, as a lieutenant in the Landwehr.

From 1845 onwards, he was active in the underground Polish Democratic Society in Greater Poland. Ludwik Mierosławski, commander-in-chief of the coming Greater Poland uprising (February 1846) appointed him as the leader of the movement in Żmudź (today's a Lithuania region). His orders were to gather the insurgent troops in Raseiniai, take Kaunas and join the troops of Congress Poland before moving to Dęblin.

To that aim, Teofil left for Königsberg (in Prussia) at the end of January 1846 and sneaked into the Russian territory under a false name. There he made contact with the leaders of the uprising in Vilnius. Spotted by tsarist agents, he soon had to flee to Prussian Memel where he was arrested by the police. Sent to Poznań, he was imprisoned at the Fort Winiary. In April 1846, he escaped from jail and went to France. The Prussian authorities issued an arrest warrant against him.

In France, he could deepen his legal knowledge at the Sorbonne while working as an emissary when necessary. As such, he participated in the Prague Slavic Congress between the 2 June and 12 June 1848: it was the first occasion where voices from nearly all Slavs populations of Europe were heard in one place.

In 1848, as a deputy to Colonel Józef Borzęcki commanding the Polish Legion in France, Magdziński planned to go to Poland. However, his unit and himself were stopped and interned in Germany. In 1849, after an amnesty, he was able to move to Prussian Poland and settle in Szamotuły. Back to his hometown, he joined the Liga Polska ("League of Poland"), a political and cultural organization founded by August Cieszkowski in Berlin in 1848, promoting the ideas of social solidarity.

Teofil Magdziński married in 1851 and installed his couple in the Imielinko estate in the Wągrowiec County, living as a gentleman farmer. Yet he was still keeping in touch with national activists and was regularly harassed by the Prussian police for it. In the end, he had to leave Prussia-controlled Grand Duchy of Posen in 1853 and transferred to Russia-occupied Congress Poland, in a village of the Łęczyca County (today north of Łódź).

Ten years later, he took part in the January Uprising: after Russia's victory he moved back in 1864, to Prussian Greater Poland soil.

=== Activity in Bydgoszcz ===
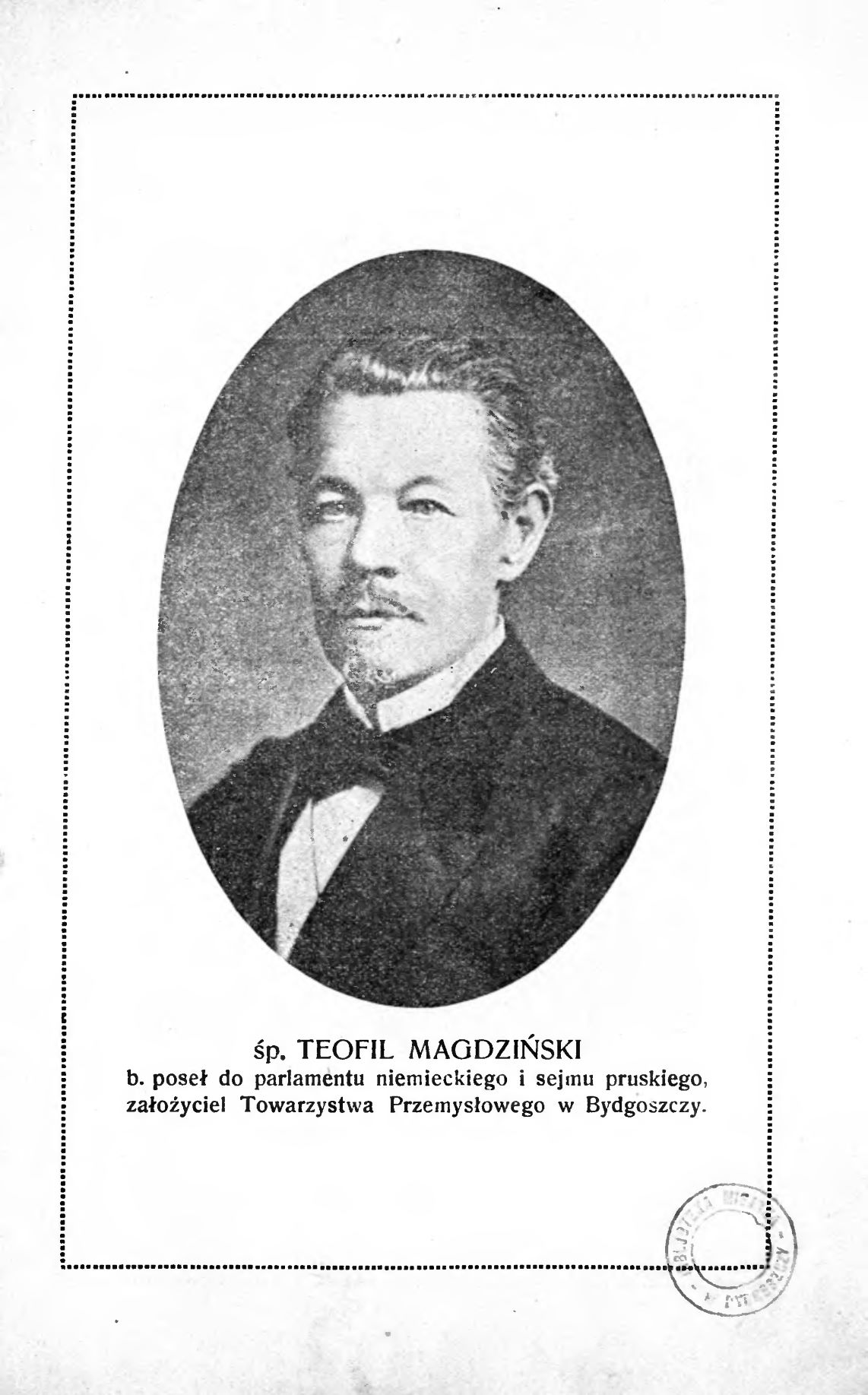
Teodor Magdzinski, in the publication celebrating the 50th anniversary of the "Industrial Society in Bydgoszcz" (1922)

At the end of the 1860s, he settled in Bydgoszcz (then Prussian Bromberg) at "28 Posener straße" (today Poznańska street) and developed an intense nationalist activity. On his and Julian Prejs's initiative, on 27 October 1872, was created the Towarzystwo Przemysłowego w Bydgoszczy (English: Industrial Society in Bydgoszcz), bringing together local notables, craftsmen, workers and small industrialists.

The association organized many activities:

- an amateur theater group (1873);
- a Polish library (1875);
- a singing club (1880), which is at the origin of the still active "Hałka" choir in Bydgoszcz;
- a Sunday craft school for students (1885).

The Society was one of the most active organizations of this type in Poznań Province, gathering with time other local activists (Emil Warmiński, Piotr Piskorski, Jan Teska, Jan Biziel).

He was as well a shareholder of the "Bank Przemysłowy w Bydgoszczy" ("Industrial Bank in Bydgoszcz").

=== Political activity ===
Teofil Magdziński was an authority for the inhabitants of Bydgoszcz of Polish origin. He represented them at the City Council and never ceased to demand their rights to be respected.

In 1871, he opposed the project of the municipality to organize celebrations on the occasion of the 100th anniversary of Poland's joining the Kingdom of Prussia: he argued that highlighting the date of this "crime" would be wicked and irritating Polish minds.

In 1873, he became a member of the Landtag of Prussia from the Buk-Kościan district. He held this mandate till his death.

In 1876, he started his career as a member of the North German Confederation Reichstag, representing various constituencies, successively:

- Jarocin-Pleszew-Września (1876);
- Koźmin Wielkopolski-Krotoszyn (1877–1878);
- Grodzisk Wielkopolski-Kościan -Nowy Tomyśl-Śmigiel (1878–1881);
- Jarocin-Pleszew-Września (1881–1889).

In the Prussian Sejm, Magdziński worked in the petition committee, and then in the budget committee. From 1880, he was the president of the "Koło Polskie" ("Polish Circle") at the Reichstag and in his last term, he also presided the "Koło Polskie" at the Prussian Sejm.

In his works at the Reichstag, he focused mainly on economic and linguistic issues, defending the rights of the Polish population, the rights of the Church and highlighting the point of view of Poles on most political issues in the German Empire. Hence he asked that the provisions of the Congress of Vienna be respected with regard to the Polish lands.

At the Prussian Sejm, he debated, among other points:

- unfair taxes on workers (1887);
- regulation of rivers (Noteć, Warta, Vistula and Neman):
- new railroad lines and road networks (1883);
- budget for the development of breeding;
- protective tariffs on agricultural products (1887).

In a memorable speech at the Reichstag in November 1884, he gave a dismissal to chancellor Otto von Bismarck, who accused Poles of being "[foreign element], rebels and perpetrators of all revolutions", replying:

"foreign elements they are indeed, because they did not want to be incorporated into the Reich and protested against it."

He also protested against the Germanization of Polish geographical names (1887) and more broadly demanded the restoration of the Polish language for administration and judiciary affairs.

=== Activity in associations ===
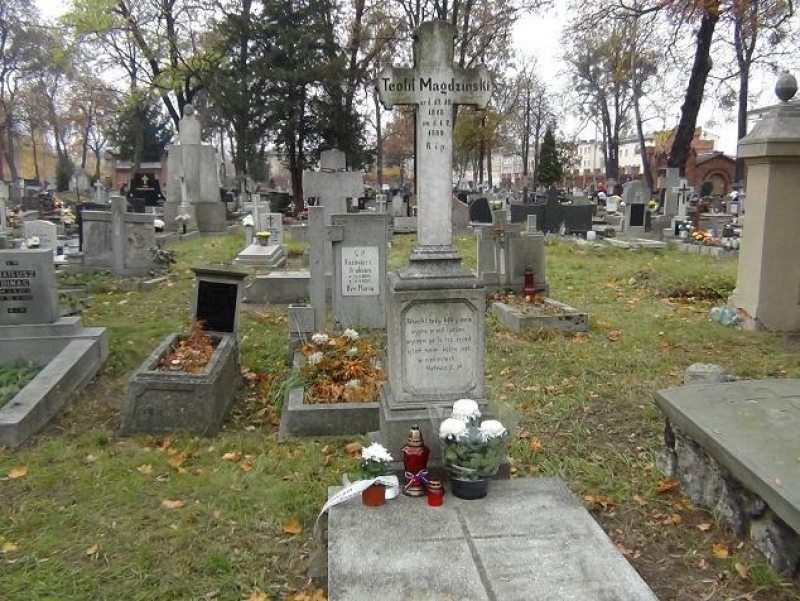
Teofil Magdziński tombstone

During his stay in Bydgoszcz, Teofil Magdziński became in 1874, a member of the "Industrial Council" which coordinated the activity of all industrial associations on Prussian occupied soil. Additionally, he was active locally in the Catholic parish and curator of the "Catholic Home for Orphans and Babies" (German: Waisen- und Kleinkinder-Bewahranstalt).

He was an active member of the "Towarzystwo Naukowej Pomocy dla Młodzieży Wielkiego Księstwa Poznańskiego" ("Society of Scientific Aid for Youth of the Grand Duchy of Poznań") for which he was the treasurer.

From 1874 to 1889 he participated in the Poznań Society of Friends of Learning.

He died suddenly on 1 February 1889, on a train near Zbąszyń (then called Bentschen).

He was buried in the Nowofarny Cemetery of Bydgoszcz on 6 February 1889. His funeral became a great national patriotic demonstration, attended by all Polish deputies to the Prussian Sejm and the Reichstag.

== Family ==
Teofil had a sister Julianna.

In 1851, Magdziński married Józefina née Arendt. She was the daughter of Hamilkar, landlord of the village of Dobieszewice in Mogilno County.

The couple had a son and a daughter, Izabella (1854-1917). She married a lawyer, Kazimierz Ćwikliński (1850-1925). The latter was a district judge in Szubin, then a district judge in Kcynia and in 1880, in Toruń. In 1894, he was appointed counselor at the chamber court in Berlin, only Pole at this position in the highest Prussian tribunal of the country.

== Commemorations ==
In 1932, a street in Bydgoszcz was named after him. It is located in the Old Town, south-east of the Old Market Square.

== See also ==
- Partitions of Poland
- Resistance movements in partitioned Poland (1795–1918)
- List of Polish people

== Bibliography ==
- Komytet jubileuszowy (1922). Pamiętnik Towarzystwa Przemysłowego w Bydgoszczy : Sprawozdanie z 50 cio-letniej czynności 1872-1922 (in Polish). Bydgoszcz: Drukarnia dla Handlu i Przemysłu.
- Błażejewski, Stanisław; Kutta, Janusz; Romaniuk, Marek (1995). Bydgoski Słownik Biograficzny. Tom II (in Polish). Bydgoszcz: Kujawsko-Pomorskie Towarzystwo Kulturalne Wojewódzki Ośrodek Kultury. ISBN 8385327274.
- Markiewicz, Alojzy Janusz (1992). Nieśmiertelne nie umiera!: z dziejów Cmentarza Starofarnego w Bydgoszczy : zarys monograficzn (in Polish). Bydgoszcz: Kujawsko-Pomorskie Tow. Kulturalne.
