= Stefan Klajbor =

Polish architect

Stefan jan Klajbor
- Born: 20 October 1924; Bydgoszcz, Poland
- Died: 5 July 1991 (aged 66); Bydgoszcz, Poland
- Occupation: architect
- Spouse: Maria Apolonia

Stefan Jan Klajbor (20 October 1924 – 5 July 1991) was an architect and a cultural personage of Bydgoszcz during the 20th century.

== Early life and studies ==
Stefan Jan Klajbor was born in Bydgoszcz on 20 October 1924. He was the son of Jan, a railwayman, and Wanda, née Nowakowski. After graduating from elementary school, he studied at the State High School of Humanities, located at 18/22 Grodzka Street (today's High Seminary of Bydgoszcz Diocese). During German occupation, he was enlisted as a worker: in 1941, he was sentenced to six months of labor camp for economic activity sabotage. From 1942 onwards, he took part in Gray Ranks (Polish: Związek Harcerstwa Polskiego, ZHP), an underground resistance movement against the Nazi forces. In May 1943, his group was responsible for the Home Army garrison's communications in Bydgoszcz. Stefan Klajbor, aka Paweł, was the liaison officer of the Garrison Headquarters with the commander of the local Gray Ranks company in Bydgoszcz.

At the end of WWII, Stefan resumed his studies at the High School Nr.2 Nicolaus Copernicus in Bydgoszcz (Polish: II Liceum Ogólnokształcące w Bydgoszczy) and was graduated in 1946. He then moved to Gdańsk to the faculty of architecture of the University of Technology: in June 1951, he received his university diploma and an architect engineering master's degree.

During his studies (1949-1951), he worked professionally as a referendary at the Maritime Office in Gdynia (Polish: Urząd Morski w Gdyni). After graduation, he was employed for several months as a deputy construction manager at the Municipal Construction department of Gdańsk, between 1951 and 1952. After that stint, Klajbor returned to Bydgoszcz.

== Work in Bydgoszcz ==
From 1952 to 1956 and from 1958 and 1967, Stefan Klajbor worked as a designer and chief engineer at the municipal project office. In 1956, he moved to the Presidium of the Municipal Council in Bydgoszcz and until 1958, he occupied the seat of the main city architect. In the years 1967–1972, Klajbor worked as a senior designer at the Kuyavian-Pomeranian Urban department in Bydgoszcz.

He took in the following years several successive positions in different agencies:

- Office of Studies and Projects Biprokabel (1972-1974 and 1975-1989);
- Bydgoszcz Construction House Complex (1974-1975) (Polish: Bydgoski Kombinat Budowy Domów);
- Municipal Department of Land Management (from 1984);
- Municipal Department of Urban Planning;
- Municipal Department of Architecture and Building Supervision.

In December 1989, Stefan Klajbor was pensioned off.

== Associative and political life ==
Stefan Klajbor was also active in the political and social domains. From 1972 to 1976, he was a member of the Democratic Party and moved between 1977 and 1980 to the Polish United Workers' Party (Polish: Polska Zjednoczona Partia Robotnicza-PZPR).

He was active in the local branch of the Association of Polish Architects:

- local board chairman (1953-1977);
- member of the competition jury (1957-1958);
- member of the college of competition judges (1963-1966).

From 1956 onwards, he participated in the Association of the friends Lovers of Bydgoszcz city (Polish: Towarzystwo Miłośników Miasta Bydgoszczy), managing the work of the urban-architectural department. In the late 1970s, Klajbor set up and chaired the Social Committee for the Rescue of Starofarny Cemetery Monuments (Polish: Społeczny Komitet Ratowania Zabytków Cmentarza Starofarnego), succeeding in listing the cemetery on the Kuyavian-Pomeranian Voivodeship Heritage List (Nr.601242 A/879, June 28, 1983).

== Personal life ==
Stefan Klajbor married Maria Apolobia, née Biernacki in 1949. They divorced in 1972.

They had three girls (Danuta-1951, Barbara-1962, Ewa-1966) and two sons (Leszek-1953, Jerzy-1956).

Stefan Jan Klajbor died in Bydgoszcz on 5 July 1991.

For his realizations and activities, he received many decorations and orders, among which:

- Golden Cross of Merit (1979);
- Knight's Cross of the Order of Polonia Restituta (1988);
- Medal of the 10th Anniversary of People's Poland;
- Medal of the 30th Anniversary of People's Poland.

== Main realizations ==
- Bydgoszcz Pomeranian Philharmonic Ignacy Jan Paderewski, 1954–1958;
- Renovation of the Museum in Grudziądz (Polish: Muzeum w Grudziądzu), ancient Palace of the Abbots in Grudziądz, 1956;
- Building of the local branch of Polish Federation of Engineering Associations (Polish: Federacja Stowarzyszeń Naukowo-Technicznych or Naczelna Organizacja Techniczna, NOT) at Jagiellońska street, 1972–1974;
- Modernization project of the Cable Factory in Ożarów Mazowiecki, 1973;
- Project for the Culture and Recreation Forest Park in Bydgoszcz, (Polish: Leśny Park Kultury i Wypoczynku, Myślęcinek), 1974.

He was also the general designer of the Selfa Housing Estate in Szczecin.

Other plans included, among others:

- reconstruction and expansion of Bydgoszcz Teatr Polski;
- renovation of the Błonie district;
- renovation of 2 and 4 Jezuicka Street in Bydgoszcz.

== Gallery ==
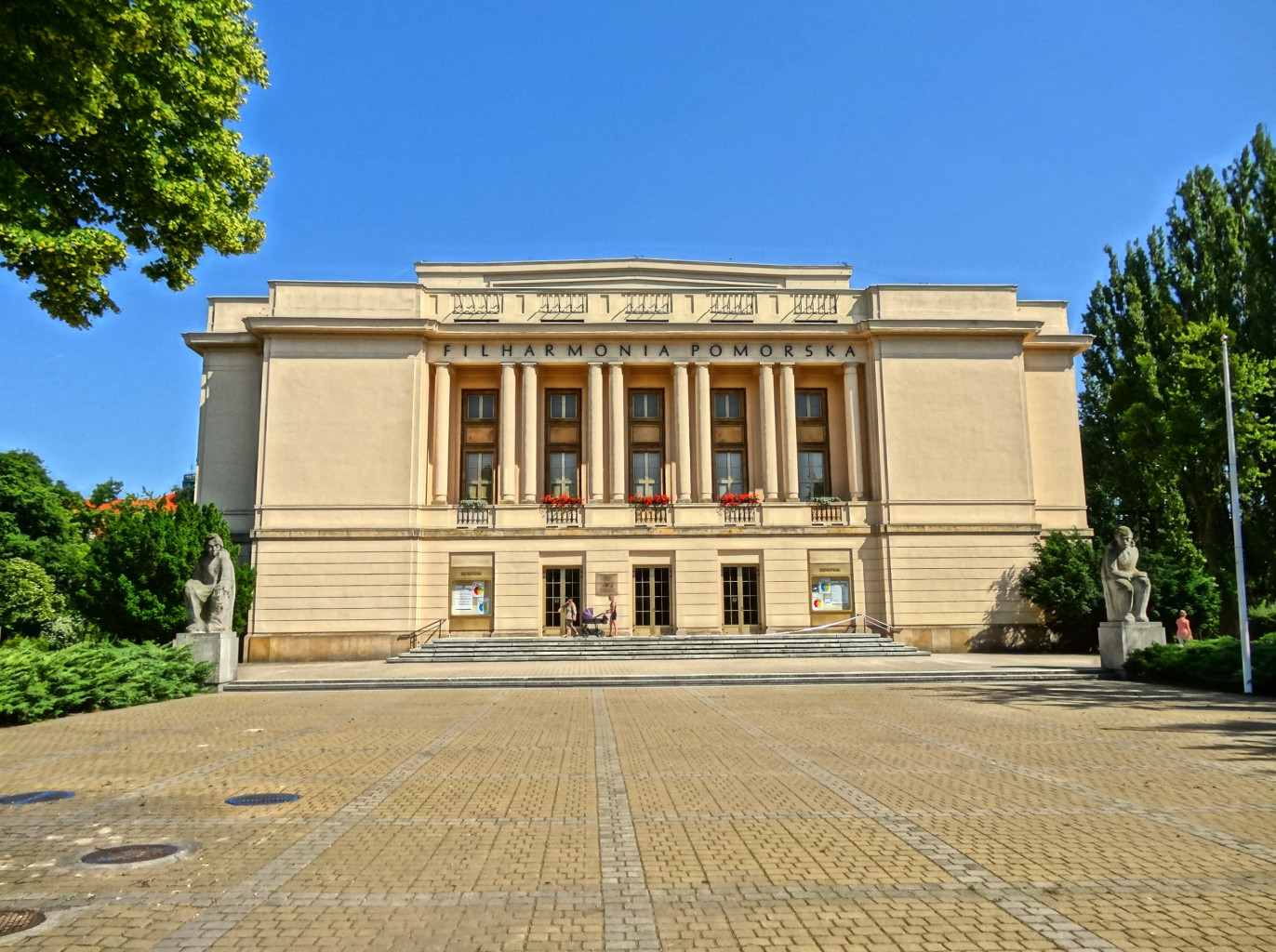
Pomeranian Philharmonic main frontage

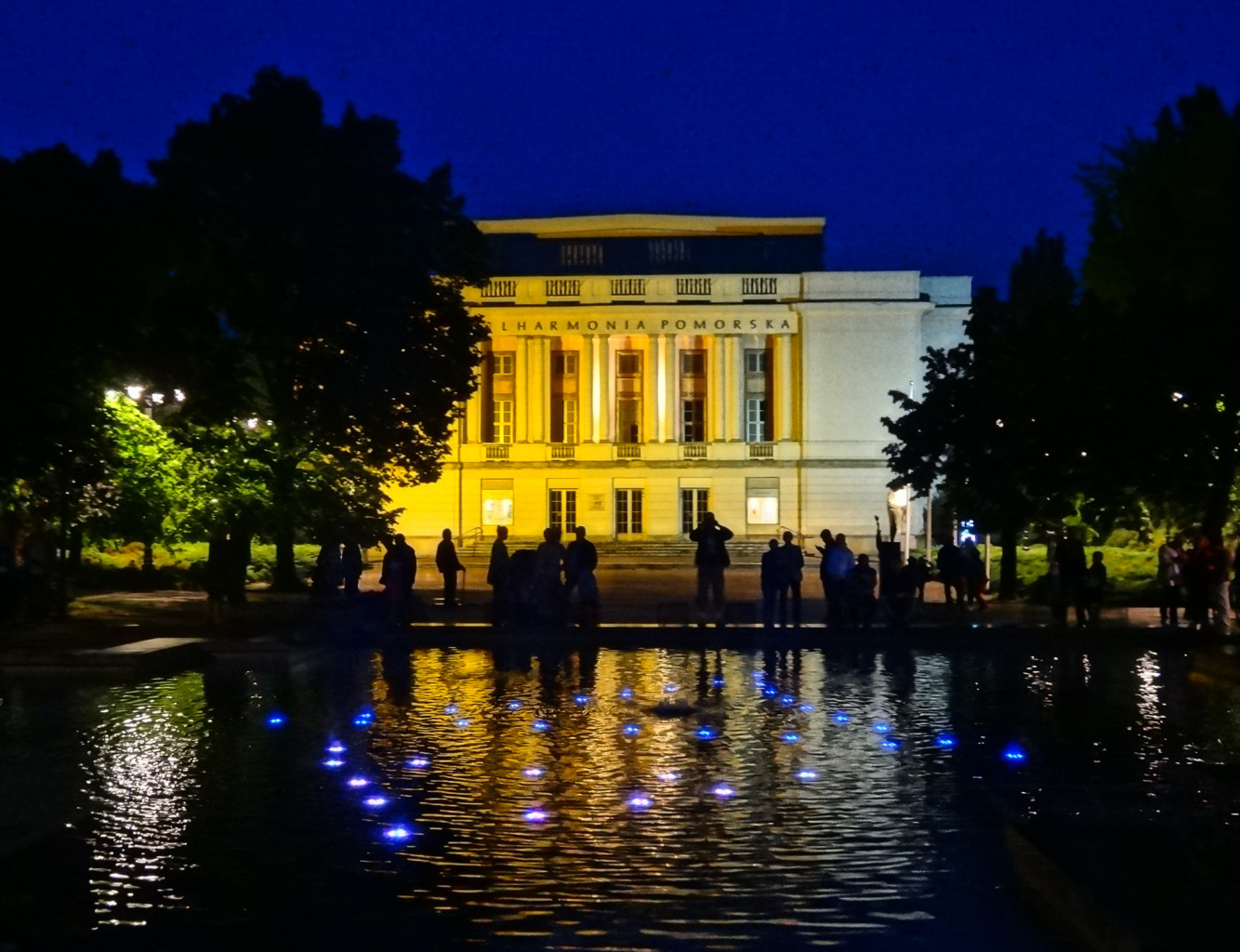
Pomeranian Philharmonic by night

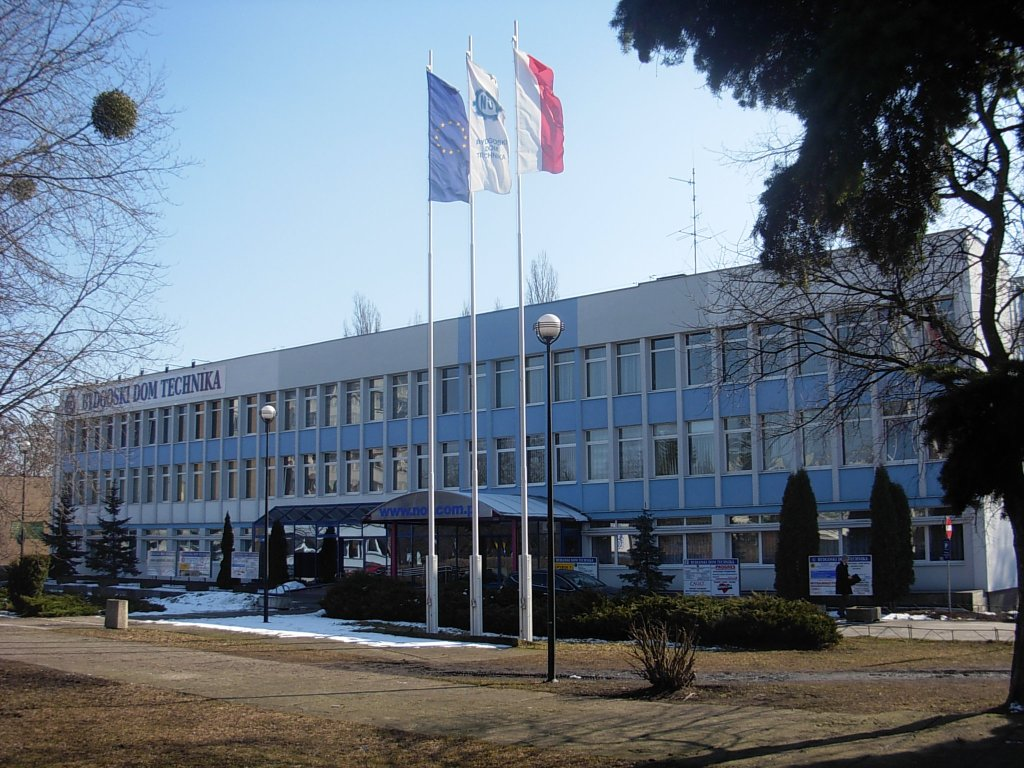
Building Dom Technika NOT

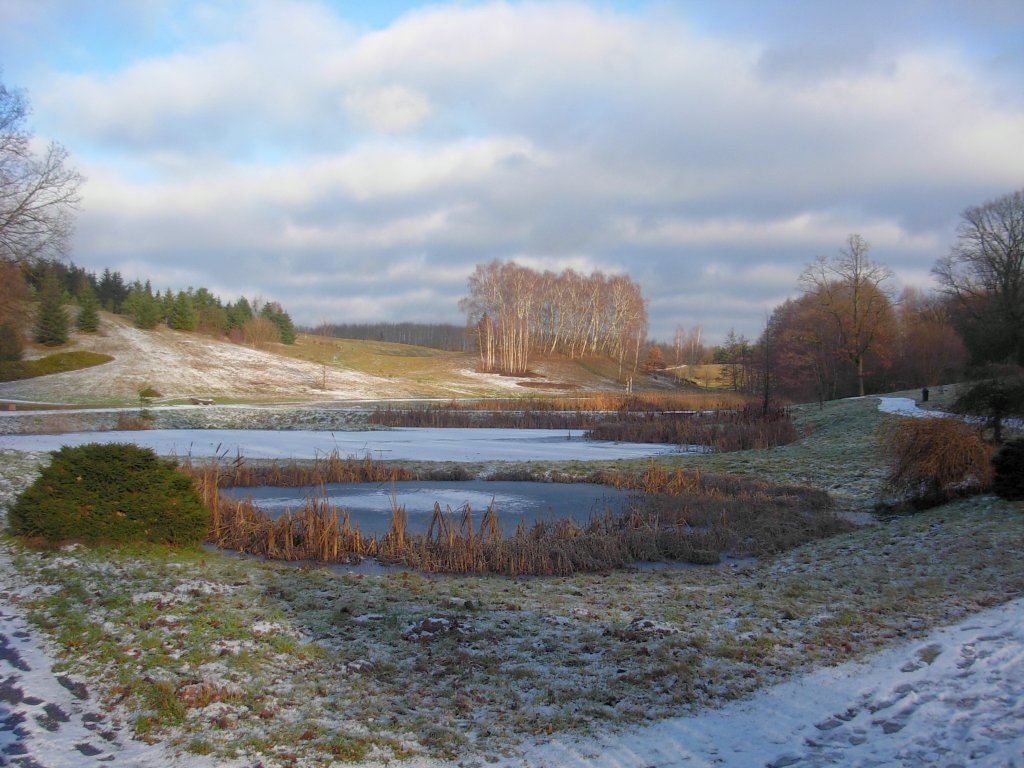
View of Myślęcinek Park

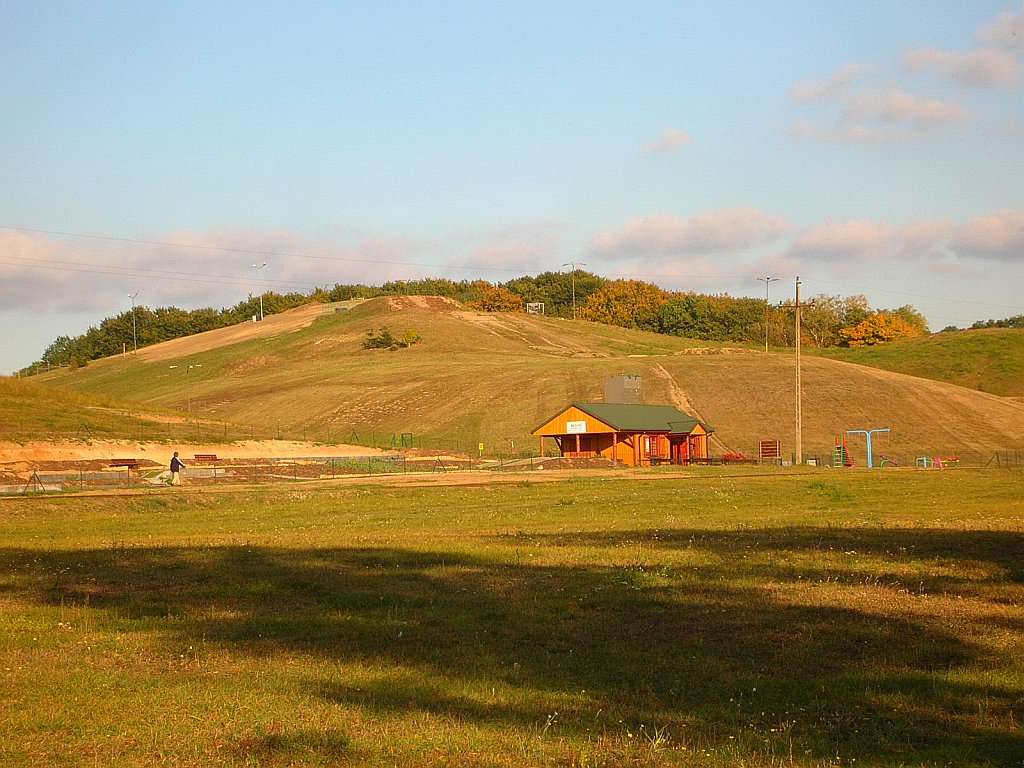
View of Myślęcinek Park

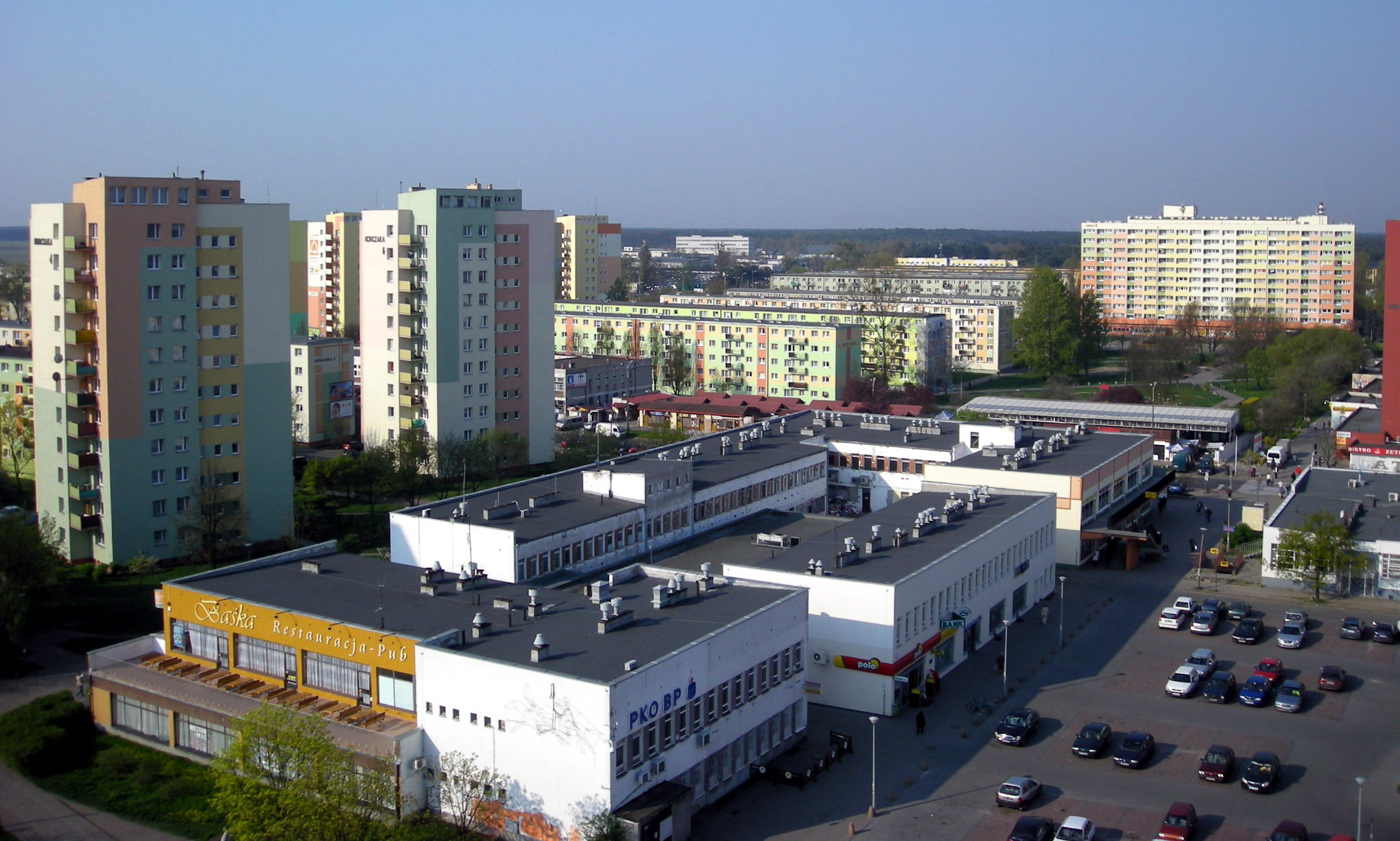
Urban complexes in Błonie district

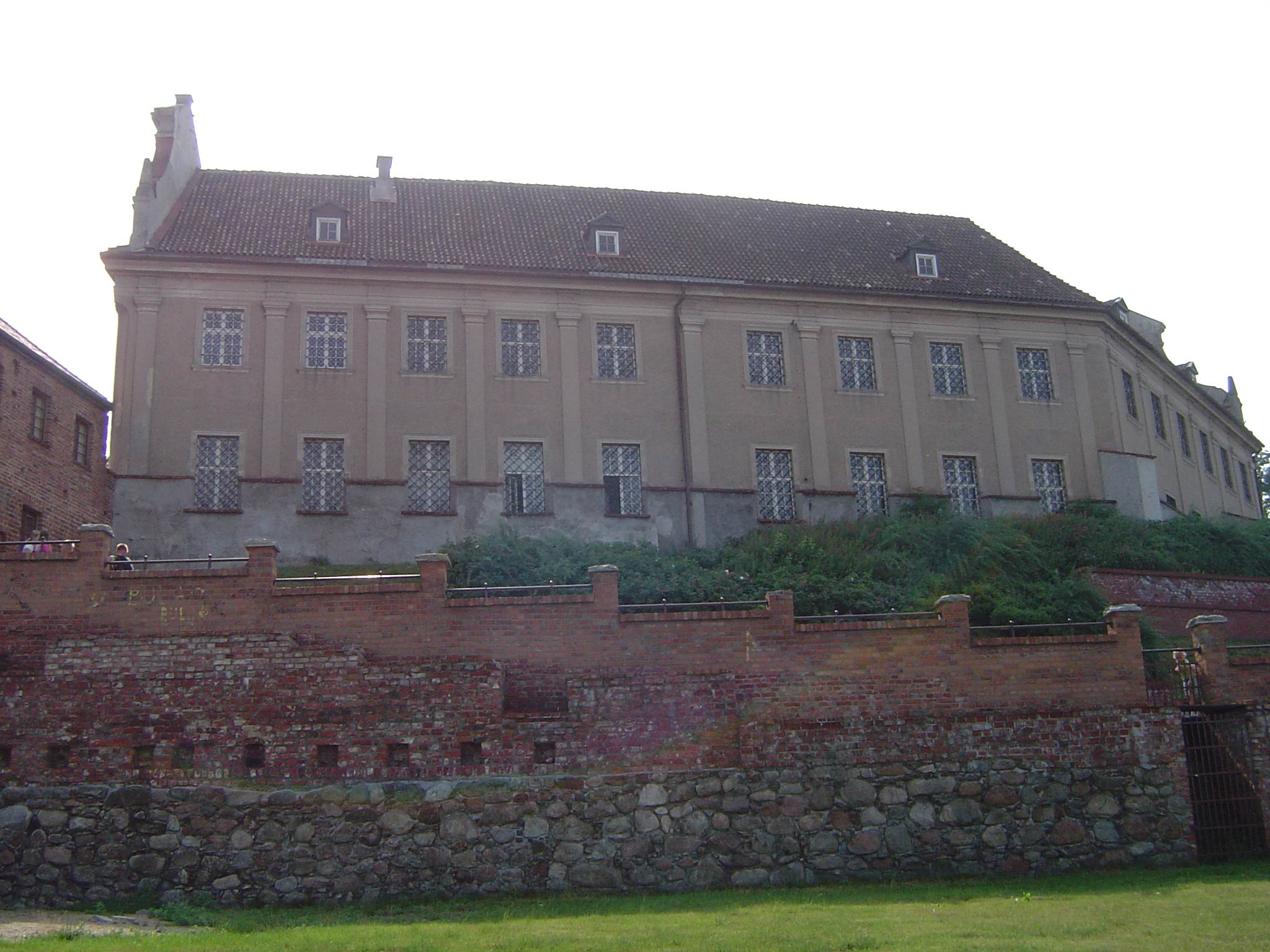
Museum, ancient Palace of the Abbots in Grudziądz

== See also ==
- Bydgoszcz
- Bydgoszcz Architects (1850-1970s)
- List of Polish people
- Pomeranian Philharmonic
- Starofarny Cemetery in Bydgoszcz

== Bibliography ==
- Błażejewski Stanisław, Kutta Janusz, Romaniuk Marek (1996). Bydgoski Słownik Biograficzny. Tom III (in Polish). Bydgoszcz: Kujawsko-Pomorskie Towarzystwo Kulturalne Wojewódzki Ośrodek Kultury. ISBN 8385327320.
