= Emil Warmiński =

Polish physician and activist (1881–1909)

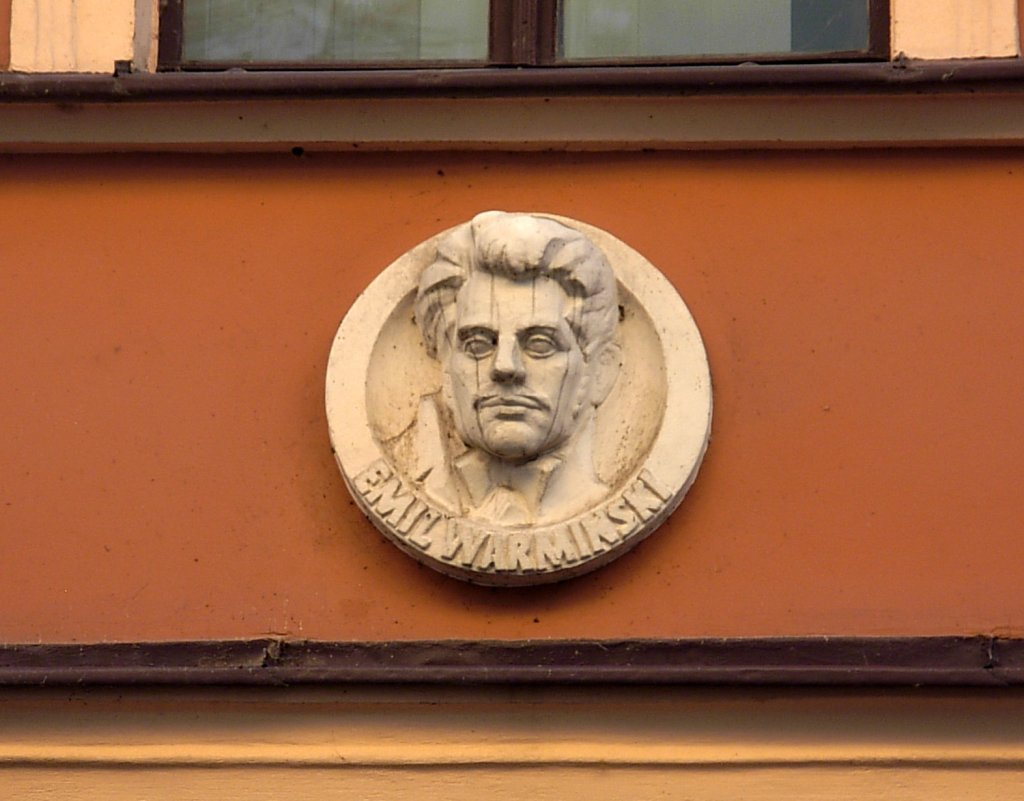
- Emil Warmiński in the 1900s
- Born: 15 March 1881; Bydgoszcz, German Empire
- Died: 9 June 1909 (aged 28); Poznań, German Empire
- Resting place: Starofarny Cemetery in Bydgoszcz
- Occupations: Physician, Polish social and national activist
- Known for: Founder of the Polish House in Bydgoszcz
- Spouse: Halina née Maya
- Children: Sławuta Maria, Przemysław Maria Longinus

Emil Warmiński (15 March 1881 – 9 June 1909) was a Polish physician, social and national activist and founder of the Polish House in Bydgoszcz.

== Biography ==
=== Youth ===
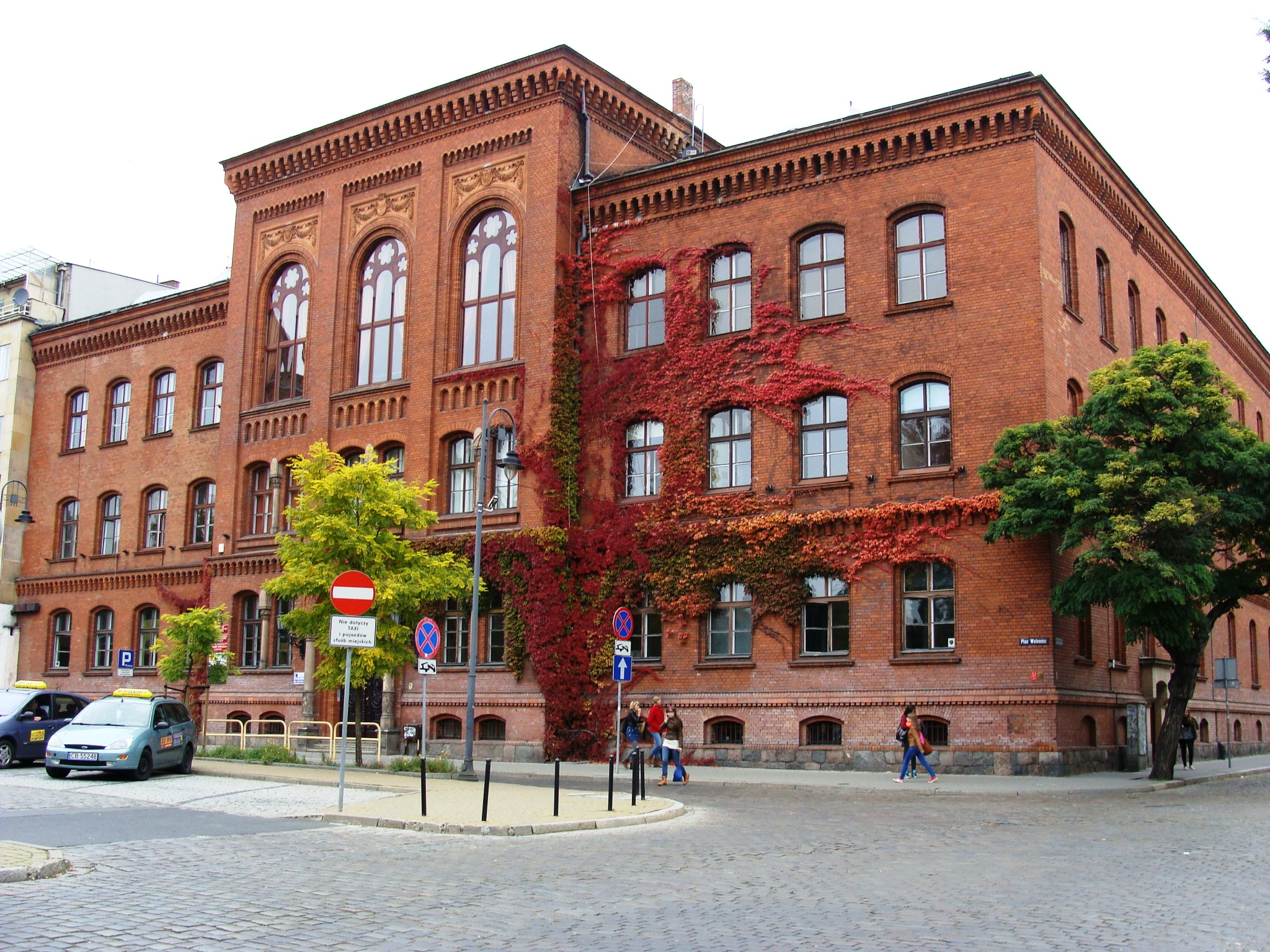
Bydgoszcz High School No. 1, then a Prussian realschule

Emil Warmiński was born on 15 March 1881 in a tenement at 6 Plac Poznański in Bromberg, then part of the German Empire. He was the son of Otto Ferdynand, a court secretary, and Małgorzata née Siudzińska, from Szubin. He had three sisters, Maria, Helena and Stanisława. His father died when he was six years old: his education was taken care of by his uncle, Stanisław Warmiński, a well-known and respected physician of the city. Stanisław took also under his tutorship Emil's sisters.

From 1890 to 1899, the young Emil studied at the downtown gymnasium, then organized as a realschule. There, he passed his matura. He was said to be an extremely talented student.

=== Medical studies in Germany ===
Immediately after graduating from gymnasium, he moved to Marburg to start medical studies, there he was the only Pole. After a first successful semester, Warmiński went to Berlin, where a large Polish studying diaspora was present, to continue his education. Already in 1903, he contributed to the establishment of a building company aiming at purchasing real estate for Polish social and cultural associations. Local journal "Dziennik Bydgoski" reports that the young student was provoked by insults thrown towards Poles by professor Schuman, from the Humboldt University. This event deeply troubled Emil: he replied to such insults in wording that could have earned him a dismissal from the faculty.

He decided to join the Sokół Polish Gymnastic Society and began to work for Polish organizations in exile. In 1904, he completed his studies in the city of Freiburg im Breisgau. The same university conferred on him the title of Doctor of Medicine, for his presentation of a thesis dealing with typhoid fever.

=== Return to Bromberg ===
Before moving back to his home town, Emil Warmiński had to complete the compulsory six-month long military service in Berlin.

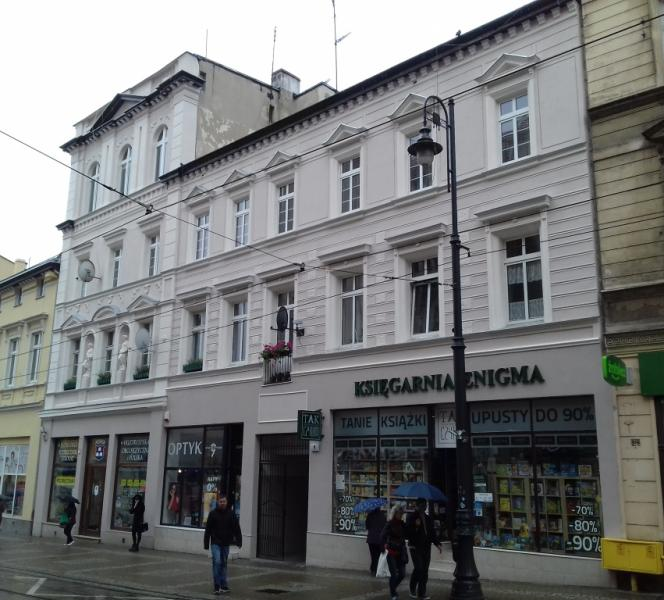
Emil Warmiński's tenement at 9 Gdańska Street

It was only in May 1905, that he returned to Bydgoszcz (then Bromberg) and launched his medical practice. His house and office were located at 9 Gdańska Street and bore on the building wall for the first time in the city a plaque with a Polish inscription "Doctor" (and not the German Arzt). This move exposed him to all kinds of animosity and harassment from some German citizens of Bromberg. He was hard at work, often selflessly helped his Polis fellows, sometimes treating them at his own expenses. Once settled, Emil additionally joined the national and social activities of the Poles in the city. From Gdańska street, the doctor moves later his office to Dworcowa Street.

Indeed, he contributed to the revival of the activities of the local Polish Gymnastic Society "Sokół", presiding the institution from 1905 to 1908. He also took part in the actions of other movements:

- the "Halka" Singing Society (Polish: Towarzystwo Śpiewu „Halka”) as a board member;
- the Society of Polish-Catholic Workers (Polish: Towarzystwo Robotników Polsko-Katolickich);
- the Industrial Association of Bydgoszcz (Polish: Towarzystwo Przemysłowego w Bydgoszczy), created by Teofil Magdziński in 1872.

Furthermore, he assisted to the establishment of:

- the Merchants' Society (Polish: Towarzystwo Kupców), becoming one of its member in 1909;
- the Merchant Youth Society (Polish: Towarzystwo Młodzieży Kupieckiej);
- the Nadnotecki Association of Doctors (Polish: Towarzystwo Lekarzy Nadnoteckich), created as a form of reaction against germanization.

During the period of Polish strikes caused by the ban on the use of the Polish language during religion classes (1907), Emil founded a library and a reading room for children. Later, he contributed to set up a reading room for women, which soon became the largest and most active institution of this type in the Province of Posen. In 1907, with the accumulated funds of his building company established four years ago while in studies in Germany, he purchased a building at 6 Gamm straße, today's 11 Doktora Emila Warmińskiego street. There Warmiński organized the first Polish House in the city, operating as a center of cultural and social life of Polish society under Prussian rule. It soon became the corner stone of the national Polish revival of Bydgoszcz. Unfortunately, the building was destroyed in August 1919, just before the city re-joined the newly re-created state of Poland.

"Invited to numerous rallies in Bydgoszcz, Gniezno, Inowrocław, Toruń and other nearby villages, Warmiński delivered passionate speeches in defense of the endangered Polish peoples", as wrote his wife Halina in her diary.

=== Fight against illness ===
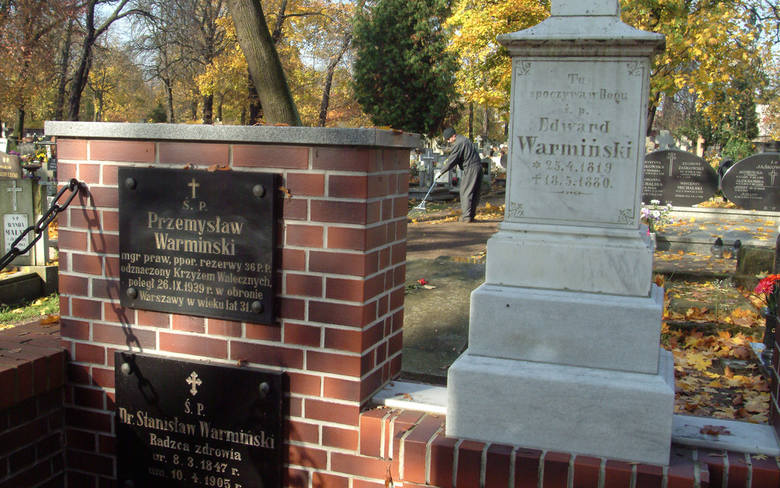
Warminski family vault

Emil Warmiński used to visit meetings and rallies, holding numerous honorary offices and writing numerous articles and dissertations for newspapers. Such an intensive work took its toll on his strength. The young activist doctor was weakened by tuberculosis and a serious intestinal disease. He attempted to fight these conditions with medications and rest in Italy, Switzerland and Zakopane (then in Austria-Hungary). After a partial recovery, he applied for the position of an assistant in the gynaecology Department of the Wrocław hospital. He relocated to the city upon the Oder in August 1908 and received successful bowel surgery immediately. However, he was still heavily weakened by tuberculosis and succumbed to it in June 1909, in Poznań.

Warmiński's remains carried back to Bromberg by train on 12 June 1909. His funeral took place the following day, a Sunday; the ceremony was attended by a large crowd of Bydgoszcz residents. From the Nowofarny cemetery chapel, the procession went along several streets of the city to Starofarny cemetery: at the grave, his choir "Halka" chanted the four-voice song "Na groby" (On the grave). Emil Warmiński was buried in the family vault in the Starofarny cemetery at 15 Grunwaldzka street. Following his death, the editorial office of the "Dziennik Bydgoski" recalled the figure and merits of the honorable doctor of "Polish hearts and souls".

=== Personal life and family ===
Emil Warmiński married Halina née Maya. After Emil's death, she married Andrzej Rozmiarek, a friend. Near her end, she lived at Puszczykowo near Poznań. In 1971, she had been interviewed by a local journalist about her first husband.

She and Emil had two children:

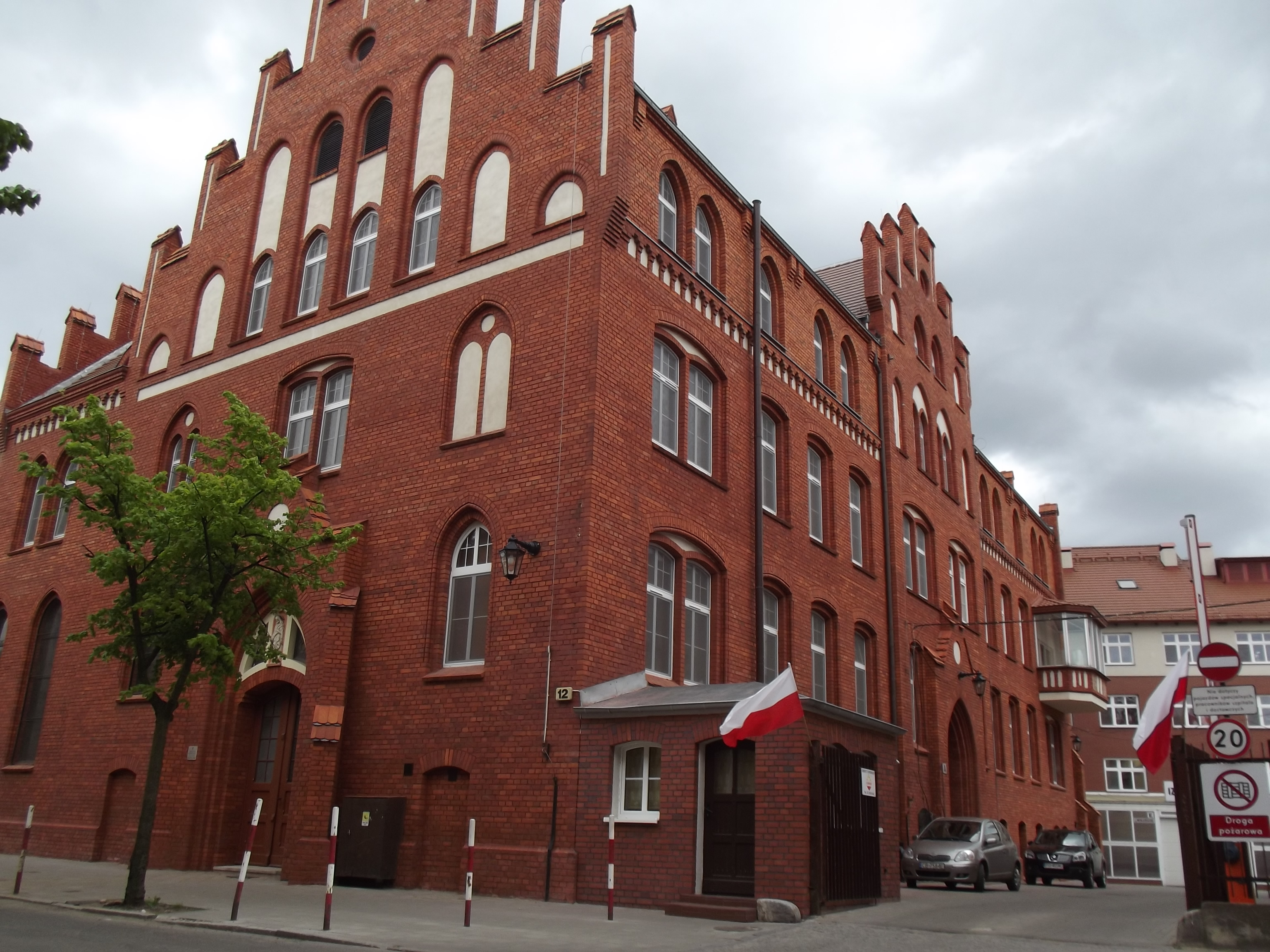
Main building of the Hospital for Infectious Diseases at 10/18 Świętego Floriana Street

- Sławuta Maria (1906–1996), married to Józef Zoll (1904–1966);
- Przemysław Maria Longinus (1908–1939), who became an accomplished tennisman, four-time Polish tennis representative at the Davis Cup and winner of two national championship (in 1930 in mixed double with Jadwiga Jędrzejowska, in 1932 in double with Ignacy Tłoczyński). In addition, he took part in the ice hockey league with the AZS Poznań, winning the Polish championship in 1934. In 1938, he became the coach of the national hockey team. Like his father, he was an activist in several associations. He joined the far-right National Radical Camp (Polish: Obóz Narodowo-Radykalny-ONR). After his sporting career, he became a journalist, writing about the political achievements of Germany and warning against the dangers of Nazi Germany in 1938–1939. Mobilized in September 1939 as a second lieutenant in the reserve, he died on 26 September 1939 during the Siege of Warsaw (1939). Przemysław Warmiński was buried in the Avenue of the Distinguished at the Powązki Cemetery.

Emil's uncle and tutor, Stanisław Warmiński, was a doctor and traveler. He obtaining in 1872, his doctorate of medicine and surgery from the university of Berlin. He was since the 1880s a member of the Historical Society for the Nadnotecki District in Bydgoszcz and actively participated in the work of professional and medical organizations. He often lectured doctors traveling to meetings about the benefit of balneotherapy in stations in Italy and North Africa. A wealthy man and a passionate traveler, he undertook distant journeys, as far as Africa. In the last 10 years of his life, he regularly journeyed to the seaside zoological station in Naples, from where he brought museum exhibits of the local fauna. He donated his collection to the Poznań Society of the Friends of Sciences. Stanisław Warmiński died in April 1905, in Bydgoszcz, from pneumonia: he was buried in the Starofarny cemetery. His bequeathed his savings to the construction of a large building for the Hospital for Infectious Diseases at 10/18 Świętego Floriana Street.

== Commemorations ==
A street in downtown district of Bydgoszcz has been named after Emil Warmiński.

Several commemorative plaques and busts are dedicated to him.

The first commemorative plaque was funded by the local Sokół association and unveiled in 1936, on the wall of the Polish House at 11 Warmińskiego street. After its destruction by the Nazis, the "Halka" Singing Society placed a new one on the very place where the previous stood: it was inaugurated on 14 June 1958 for the occasion of the 75th anniversary of the association. This plaque stood until the demolition of the building in February 2019: however, the commemorative plaque will be positioned back on the plot at the end of the building works.

In 1959, another commemorative plaque was set on the wall of High School Nr.1 on Plac Wolności, where Emil Warmiński studied.

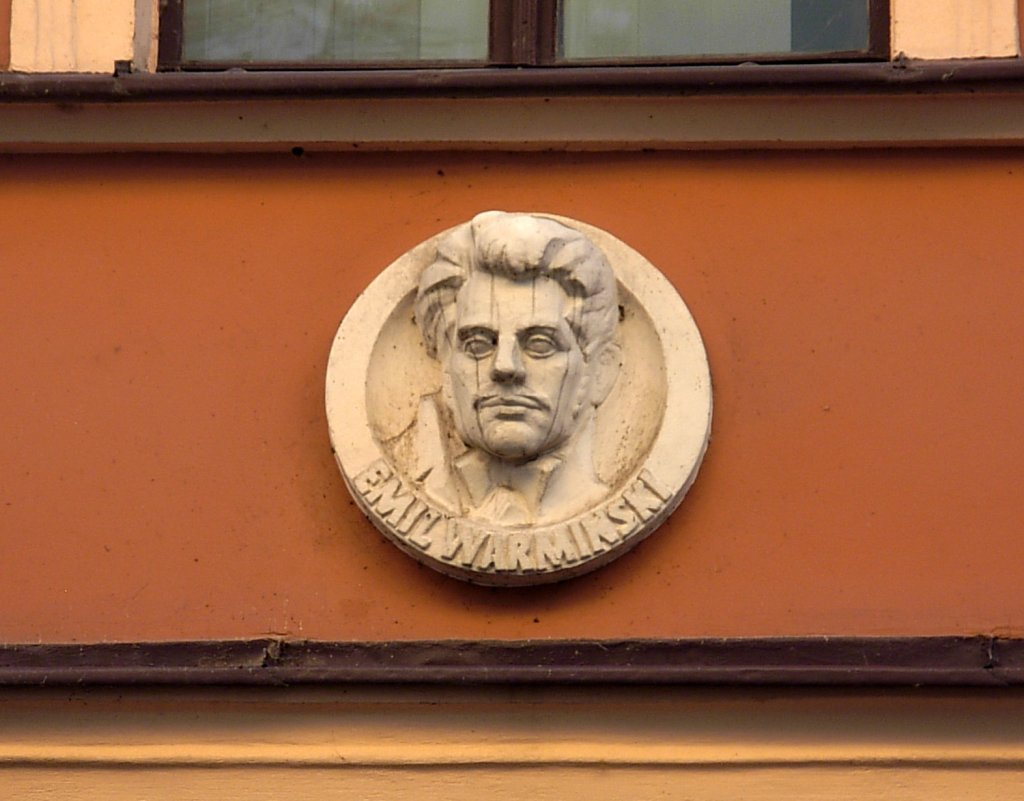
Medallion of Emil Warmiński at 2 Jezuicka Street in Bydgoszcz

On 30 December 1959 the name Emil Warmiński was given to a hospital in Bydgoszcz, at 19 Szpitalna street.

In 1980, a medallion-shaped sgraffiti of Emil Warmiński, designed by Witold Wasik, was set up on the front elevation at 2 Jezuicka Street, housing inter alia, the Library of the History Department of Kazimierz Wielki University and the Department of Culture of the City Hall. This medallion is part of a series comprising four other scientists and artists associated with Bydgoszcz and the region: Jan Kasprowicz, Jan Śniadecki, Jędrzej Śniadecki and Leon Wyczółkowski.

On 12 December 1986 the name Emil Warmiński was given to the Bydgoszcz Medical Schools at 10 Swarzewska.

Emil's busts can be found in the city hospital (since 1975) and in the hall of the Secondary School N.8 (since 1986).

In 2017, the namesake of Emil Warmiński has been assigned by plebiscite of Bydgoszcz inhabitants to one of the 18 new tramways purchased by the city.

== See also ==
- Jan Biziel
- List of Polish people
- Stanisław Warmiński

== Bibliography ==
- (in Polish) Błażejewski Stanisław, Kutta Janusz, Romaniuk Marek (1994). Bydgoski Słownik Biograficzny. Tom I. Bydgoszcz: Kujawsko-Pomorskie Towarzystwo Kulturalne Wojewódzki Ośrodek Kultury. p. 113.
- (in Polish) Kulpiński, H. (1971). Młody lekarz serc dusz polskich. Kalendarz Bydgoski. Bydgoszcz: Towarzystwo Miłośników Miasta Bydgoszczy. pp. 145–149.
