= Starofarny Cemetery =

Urban catholic cemetery in Bydgoszcz, Poland

- Cmentarz Starofarny
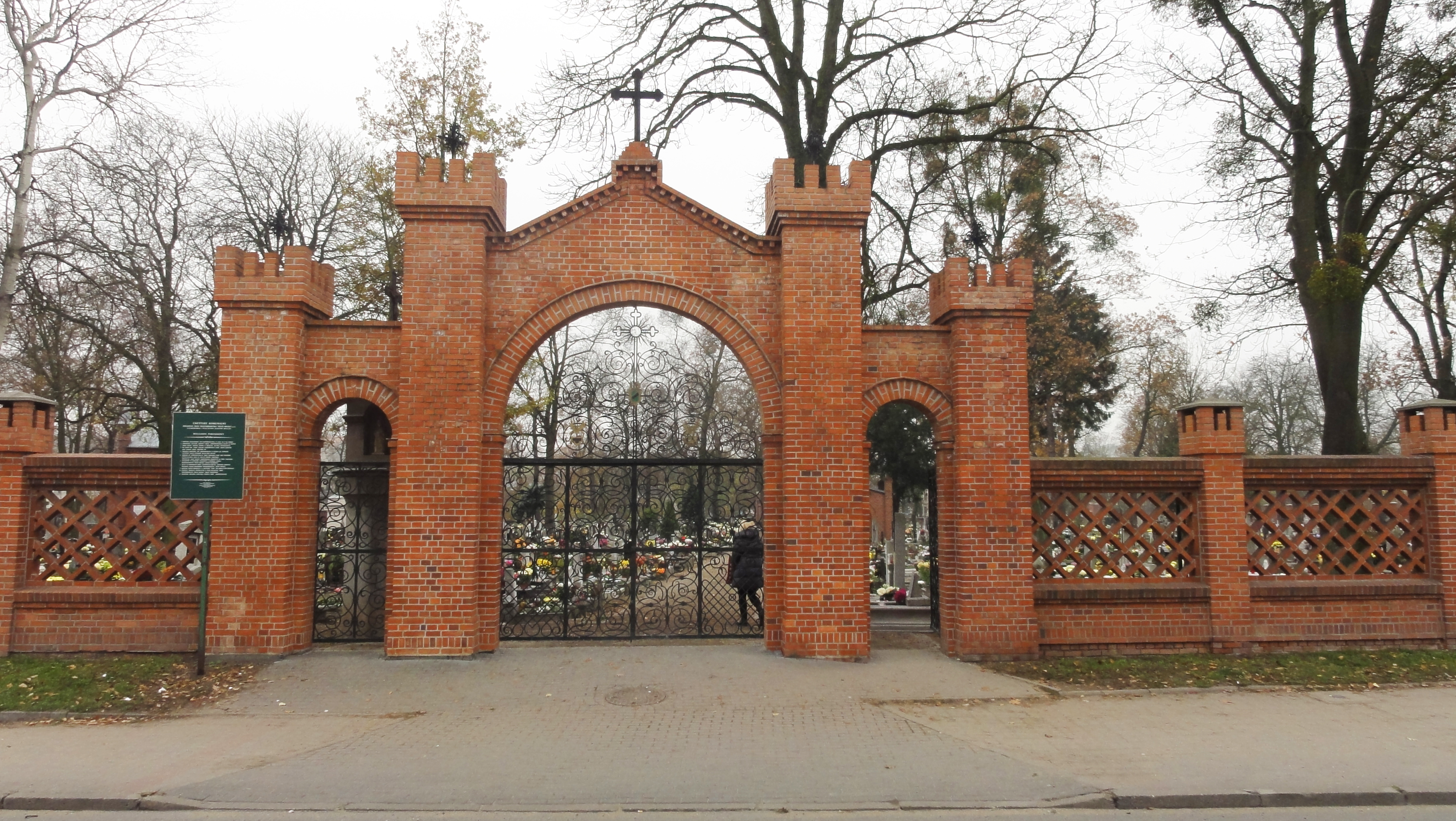
- Main entrance gate to the cemetery
- Interactive map of Starofarny Cemetery

Details
- Established: 1809
- Location: Bydgoszcz
- Country: Poland
- Coordinates: 53°07′37″N 17°59′01″E
- Type: Public
- Owned by: City of Bydgoszcz
- Size: 3.2 hectares (7.9 acres)
- Website: www.cmentarze.bydgoszcz.pl

The Starofarny Cemetery is i cemetery in Bydgoszcz, Poland. It is the oldest Roman Catholic cemetery in Bydgoszcz. It has been registered on the Kuyavian-Pomeranian Voivodeship Heritage List.

== Location ==
The cemetery is located in the Okole district, west of the city center. The area has a roughly triangular shape, delineated to the north-east by the Grunwaldzka Street, to the north-west by the Wrocławska Street and to the south by a segment of the Bydgoszcz Canal.

The burial site is situated in the green area of the urban Bydgoszcz Canal Park (Polish: Planty nad Kanałem Bydgoszczem).

During Prussian time, its address was Berlinerstrasse 13. Afterwards, the cemetery was located on Świętej Trójcy Street before bearing the current address at 15 Grunwaldzka street.

== History ==
=== Prussian period ===
In 1808, the city council of then Bromberg purchased four Magdeburg Morgen of land (ca. 1 hectare (2.5 acres)) along the road leading to Szyszkówko (Polish: Czyżkówko, now a district of Bydgoszcz), with the intention of establishing a cemetery for the Roman Catholic inhabitants.

The sale of the plot was registered on 9 April 1808 and the entire transaction was completed in December 1808. This area was then transferred to the ownership of the Parish of Bydgoszcz. The first burials were carried out in 1811, as the Prussian authorities had issued a ban on burying the deceased in church cemeteries.

As a matter of fact, the Starofarny Cemetery was the first municipal Catholic cemetery detached from the parish premises: people from the city and the surroundings were buried there. In 1828, one of the abutting roads was transformed into a cobbled street leading to Nakło nad Notecią and Koronowo (i.e. the future Grunwaldzka Street).

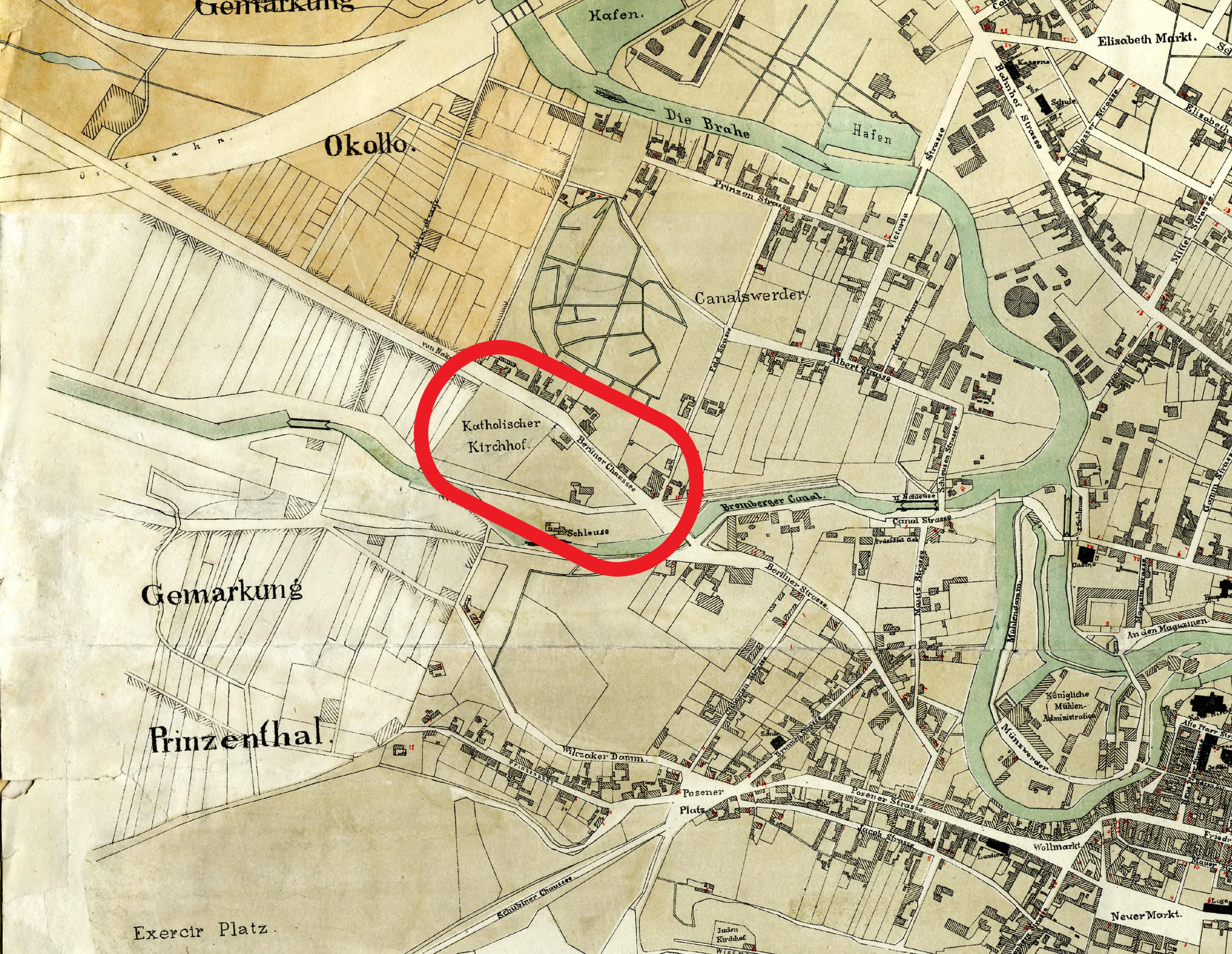
Starofarny cemetery on a 1876 map

In 1855, the cemetery was expanded by 0.40 ha, thanks to the purchase buying of land from the Sowiński family for almost 78 thalers. In 1906, the site covered a surface of 1 ha, 42 ares and 50 square meters or 14,250 square metres (3.52 acres).

While Polish territory was progressively divided then disappeared from 1795 to 1920, the frequent funerals of distinguished citizens at the Starofamy cemetery were the occasions of patriotic demonstrations, especially during national uprisings (e.g. 1794, 1830–1831). In 1877, with the incorporation of the Okole suburb into the territory of Bromberg, the burial site entered the city premises.

Until 1892, the cemetery was neither organized into sections nor graves numbered nor any regulations specified. There was only a division between burials in exposed places, more expensive than ordinary tombs.

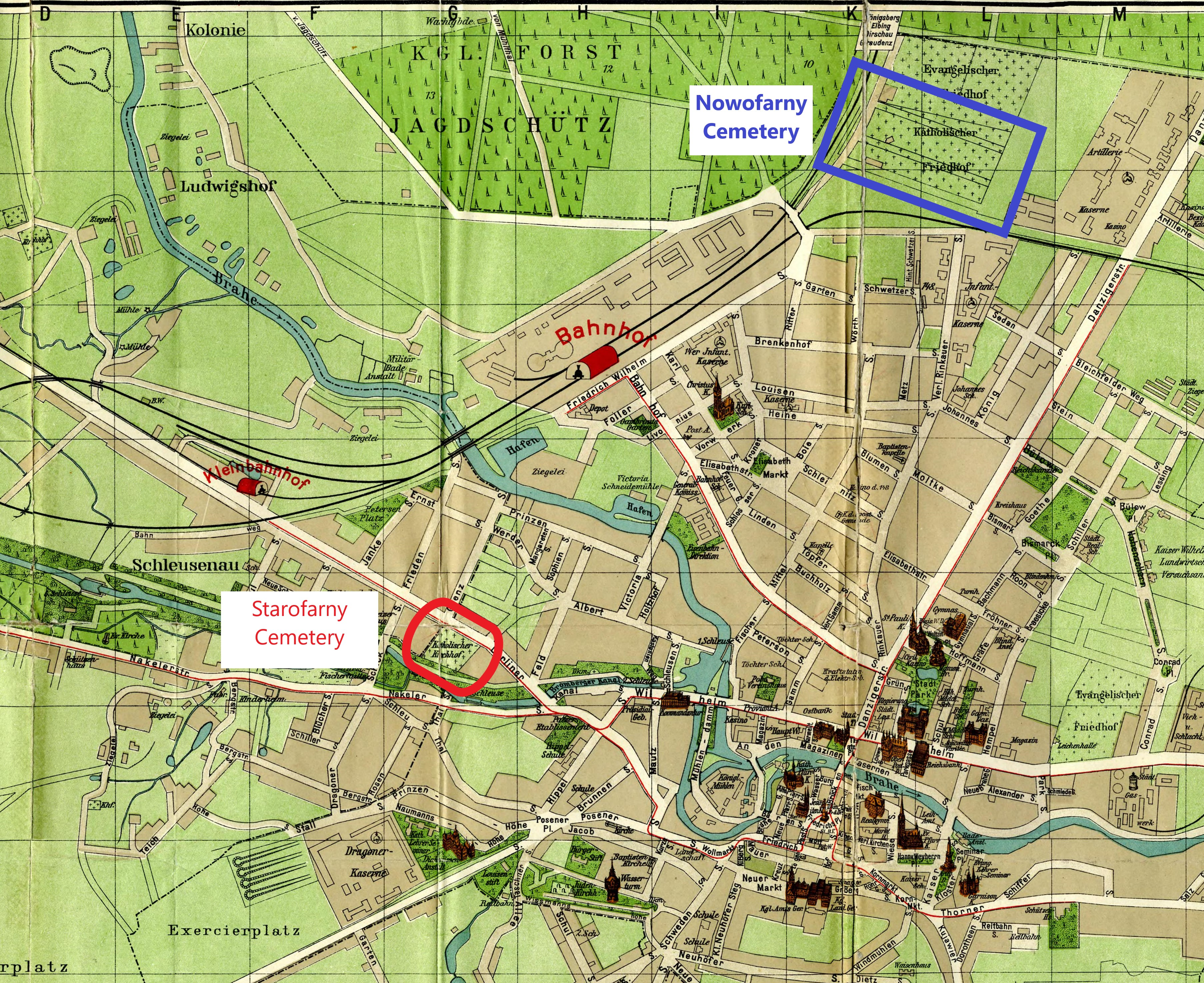
Nowofarny and Starofarny cemeteries on a 1908 map

From the second half of the 19th century on, the gravesite was enlarged and embellished:

- a new brick fence was built (1886);
- alleys were planted with of chestnuts, maples and lime trees (1892).

The site reached its full capacity at the beginning of the 20th century, but Prussian regulations banned any establishment of new Catholic sacred facility and the cemetery could no longer be used.

In 1906, Father Ryszard Markwart, then parson of the only catholic parish of Bromberg, obtained permission from the Prussian authorities to establish a new parish cemetery on the northern outskirts of the city which would be called the New Parish Cemetery or Nowofarny Cemetery (Polish: Nowofarny Cmentarz): from that date, the previous gravesite has been called Old Parish Cemetery or Starofarny Cemetery.

=== Interwar period ===
In 1924, Edmund Dalbor, then Primate of Poland, endorsed the division of the Bydgoszcz Parish into six administrative units. As a consequence, the right to conduct burials in the Starofarny cemetery was granted to the Holy Trinity parish.

In 1936, the municipal council adopted a resolution allowing the city to tend for the grave of the painter and patriot Maximilian Piotrowski, buried in the Starofarny site.

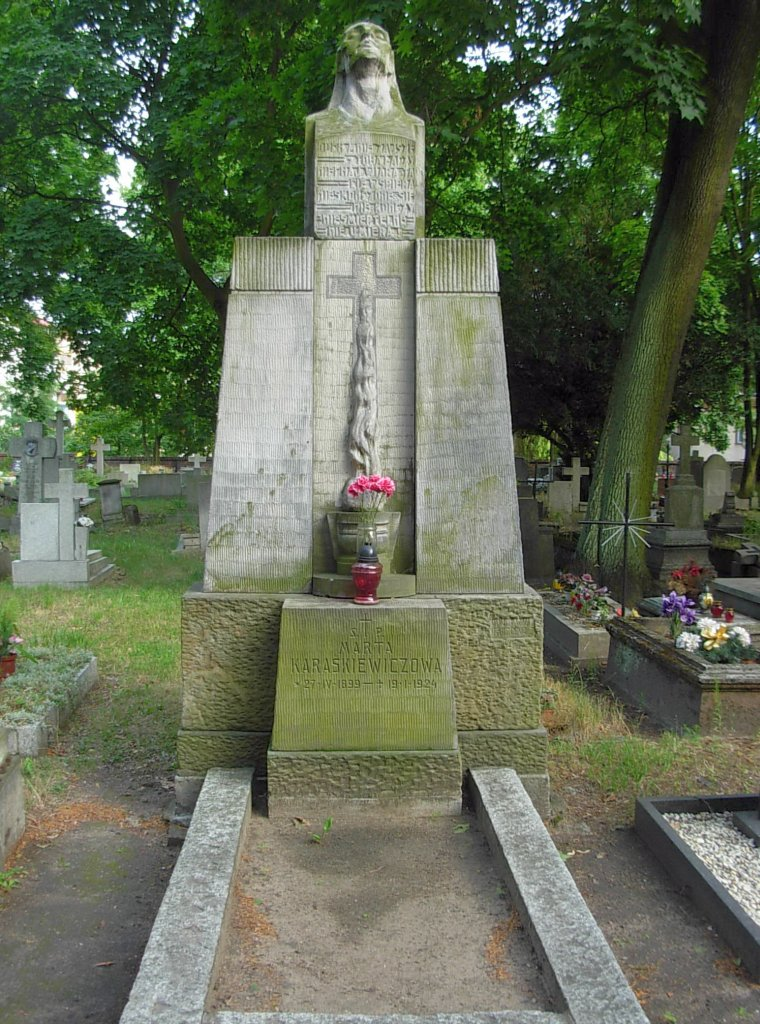
Art Deco gravestone of Marta Karaśkiewiczówna (1899–1924)

=== 1939–1945 ===
During the Nazi occupation, the cemetery was repeatedly assaulted by the occupiers, aiming to destroy any signs of Polishness in the city. The German authorities issued an order to remove Polish inscriptions from the tombstones.

In addition, the graveyard was attacked by local Hitler Youth groups who destroyed Polish tombstones, covered up Polish inscriptions and damaged the fence. On an early morning of a Sunday of April 1942, the burial area was raided by SA and SS troops who smeared with cement Polish gravestone markings and destroyed grave metal objects. The damage was repaired after the conflict by the families of the deceased and the residents of the neighboring houses.

=== Polish People's Republic (1945-1989) ===
From 1945 to 1964, despite being full, the cemetery was still used for burials in family graves and in places of abandoned old graves from the 19th century. On 11 July 1964, the last inhumation (late Henryk Barański) took place. On 15 July 1964, the necropolis was closed by decision of the Municipal People's Council of Bydgoszcz and renamed Communal Cemetery.

On 12 June 1977, a municipal plan to modernize the road network in the area of the intersection of the streets Focha, Kruszwicka, Nakielska and Grunwaldzka impacted the cemetery. Indeed, the new street layout required part of the northern side of the site to be liquidated.

Demolition works began in 1978. They encompassed:

- the reconstruction of the fencing, as the 1909 original wall was demolished (alongside with the central gate);
- the demolition of chapels;
- the exhumation of some graves.

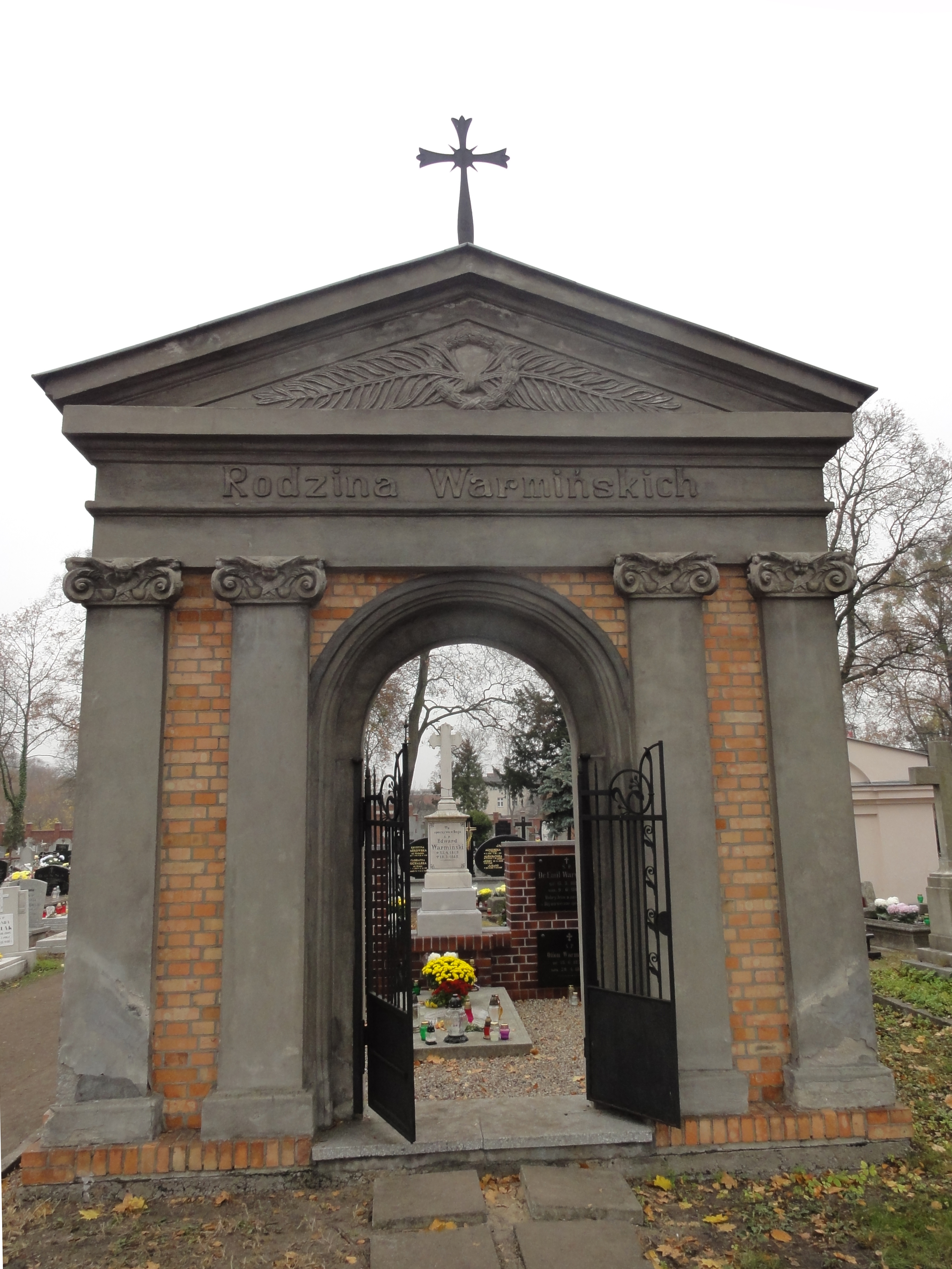
Warminski family crypt

Much damage was done during the job:

- destruction of the historic (1663) chapel of the Divine Passion;
- loss ot many family tombs (Magdziński, Warmiński, Hennert, Poniecki, Schneider, Wirski);
- destruction of the cemetery caretaker's house (then at 17 Grunwaldzka street) and profanation of the remains of the deceased;
- razing of the Wollschleger's chapel, located to the left of the cemetery gate, with marble epitaph plaques on both sides of the door and a painting of Our Lady of Częstochowa in a glassed-in niche above the entrance. This chapel, featuring Neo-Gothic style, was one of the most original. It had been built of brick in 1885 and displayed, among others, an intricately forged grate in the entrance door and a crown-gable with a miniature figure of Christ based on the famous sculpture by Bertel Thorvaldsen.

The hand-forged grille that used to stand at the cemetery gate was returned to the Poor Clares' Church from where it had been taken after the latter was closed by the Prussians in the 19th century. Other sectors of the cemetery witnessed unfortunate exhumations area as well, such as the Sergot family grave which granite tombstone disappeared.

In response to these events, a Social Committee for the Rescue of Monuments of the Starofarny Cemetery was set up in the late 1970s. Led by architect Stefan Klajbor, the association succeeded in having the Starofarny cemetery entered into the register of monuments on 28 June 1983 (Nr. 601242 A/879).

In 1984, a plan for the tidying up, conservation and development of the site was drawn up and in 1985, the diocesan curia of Gniezno transferred freely the premises to the management of the city's administrative authorities.

=== Recent period ===
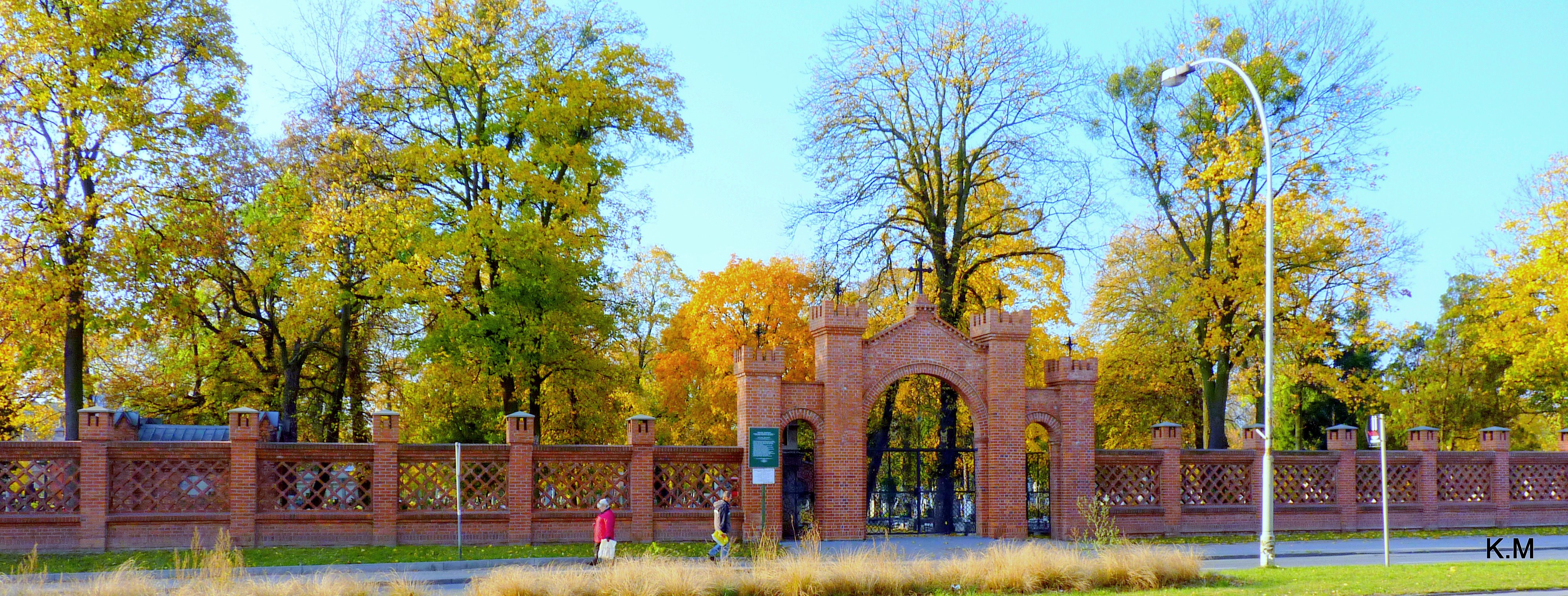
Panoramic view of the restored fence and entrance

In 1991, a decade-long cemetery's revalorisation plan started. It aimed at addressing:

- the reconstruction of the fence;
- the conservation of the historic ensemble of chapels;
- the restoration up of the 1870 Franco-Prussian War French military graveyards;
- the reconstruction of the 17th century chapel.

Since 1998, works have been supported with fundings collected annually in Bydgoszcz during All Saints' Day. In 2009, these funds supported the renovation the fence and family chapels.

In 1994, the city authorities reopened the cemetery to burials, in particular in the case of local distinguished persons.

== Characteristics ==
The Starofarny Cemetery covers an area of 3.2 hectares (7.9 acres). It is organised into 10 rectangular sections, separated by earthen alleys. In its center stand an ancient funeral chapel and the cemetery cross.

The southern side of the site houses brick tomb chapels of the following families: Modrakowski, Kościński, Markowski, Łasiński and Bogiński. Elsewhere, one can find also the tombs of the Czarliński and Dienhof-Hotomski families.

The wall overlooking the Bydgoszcz Canal had been rebuilt in the 1980s and the one giving onto Grunwaldzka Street in 2008.

=== Greenery ===
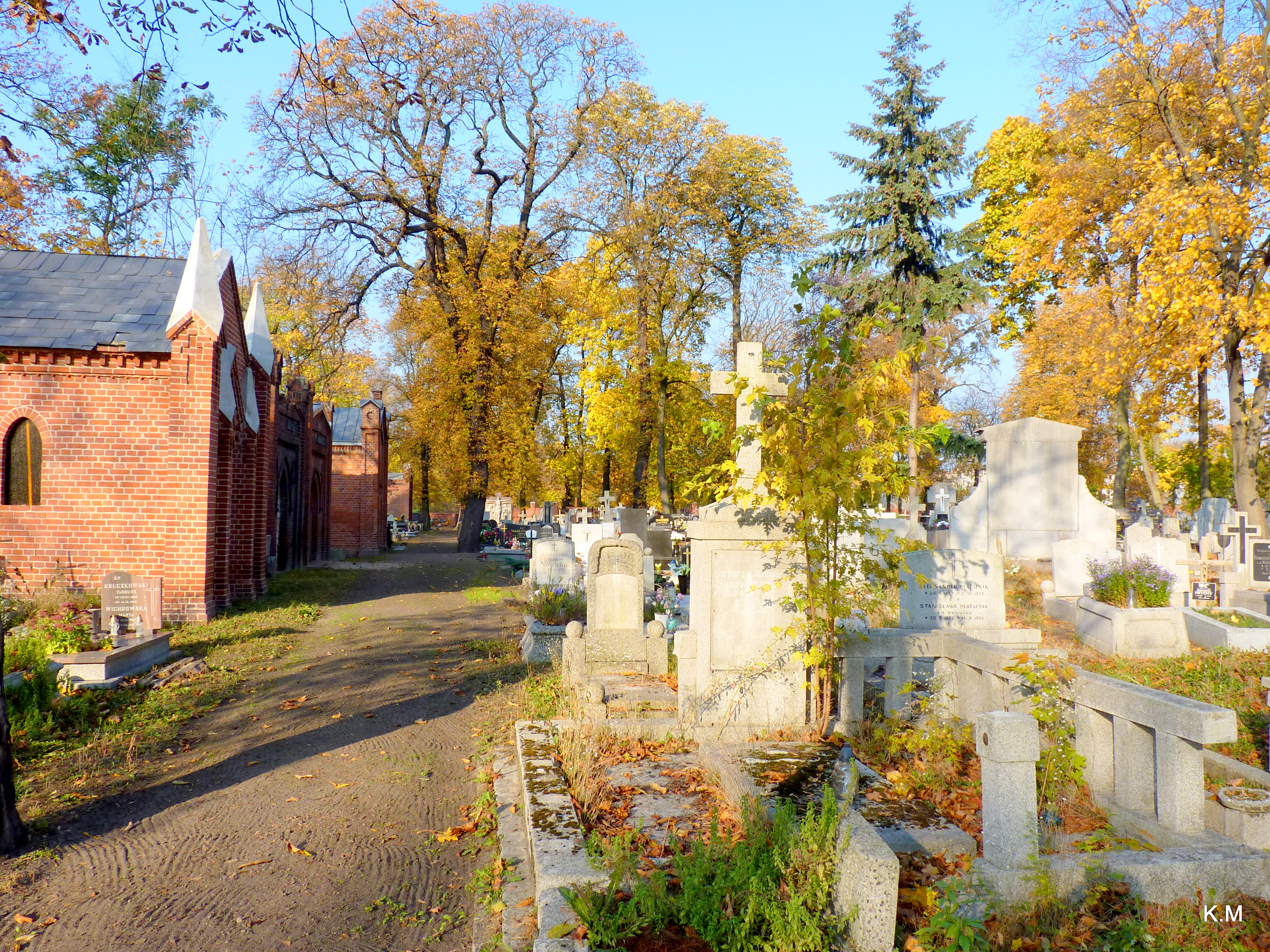
View of chapels

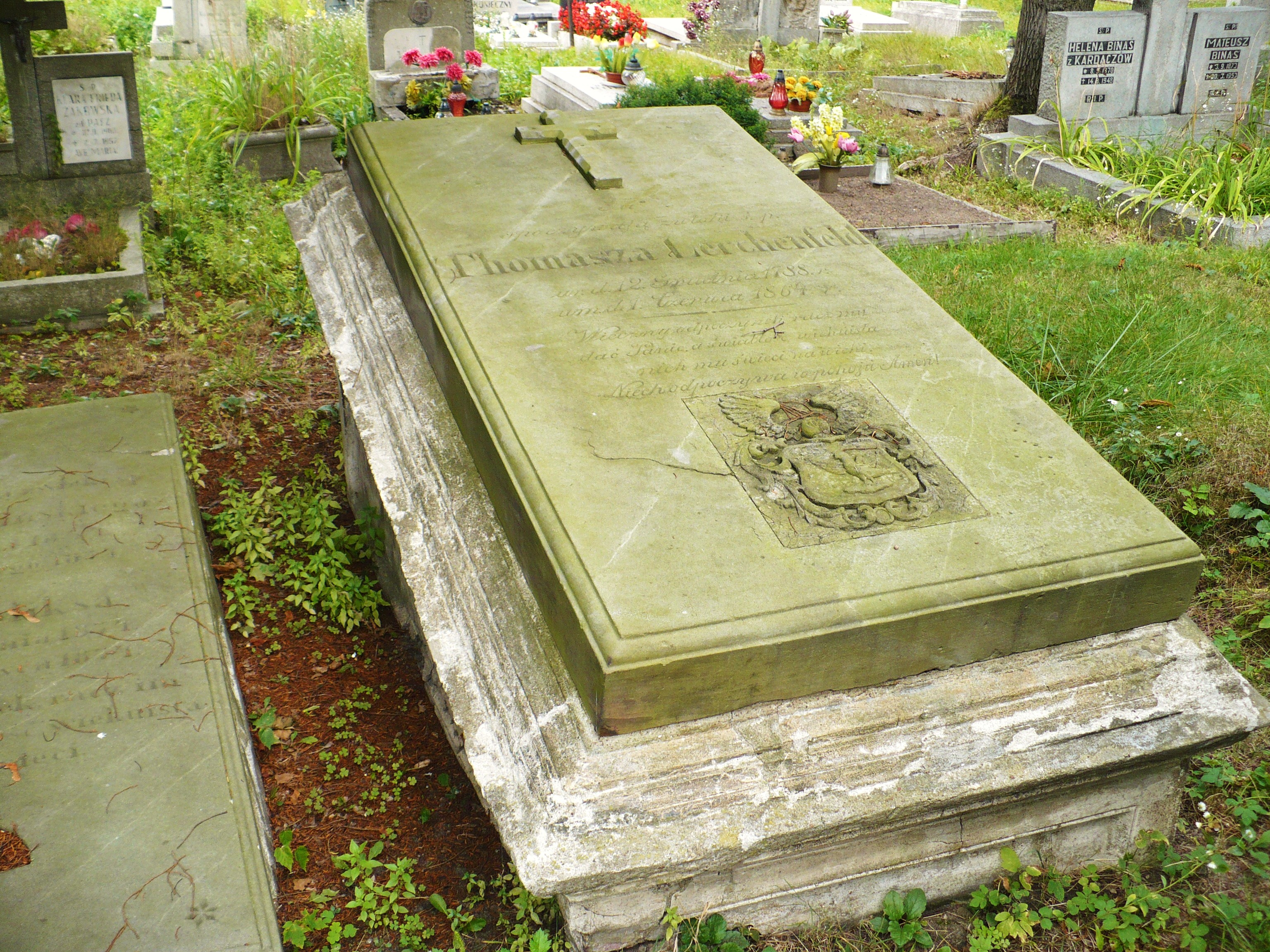
Baron Lerchenfeld tombstone (1864)

Along the alleys grow various foliage: over 100-year-old chestnut trees, lindens, maples, spruces, thujas and acacias. The main alley is planted with lime trees and side alleys with maples and chestnut trees.

=== Historic buildings ===
The premises host many a tomb of historical value, among which:

- graves of French soldiers who died during the Franco-Prussian War in 1870–1871 (see article below);
- graves of distinguished Bydgoszcz citizens;
- the cemetery chapel of the city denizens murdered in 1939.

One of the oldest artefact in the cemetery is a catholic cross from 1663 and Ignacy Rutkowski's gravestone is the oldest preserved tombstone (1852). Other ancient gravestones date back to 1864: Kazimierz Janowski and Baron Lerchenfeld.

Most of the graves are from the beginning of the 20th century and the interwar period. 35% of them are considered as objects of historical value.

Among the monuments of art, there are works of sculptors, blacksmiths, as well as stained glass artists and painters. Most of the chapels feature Neogothic motifs, adorned with lesenes, cornices, archivolts and crosses.

On the site several tombstones have special artistic value, being the work of famous local artists, such as Piotr Triebler. Many gravestones have sculptures depicting angels, Mary or Jesus. Some of them bear non-standard inscriptions, like quatrains.

=== French soldiers' graves corner ===
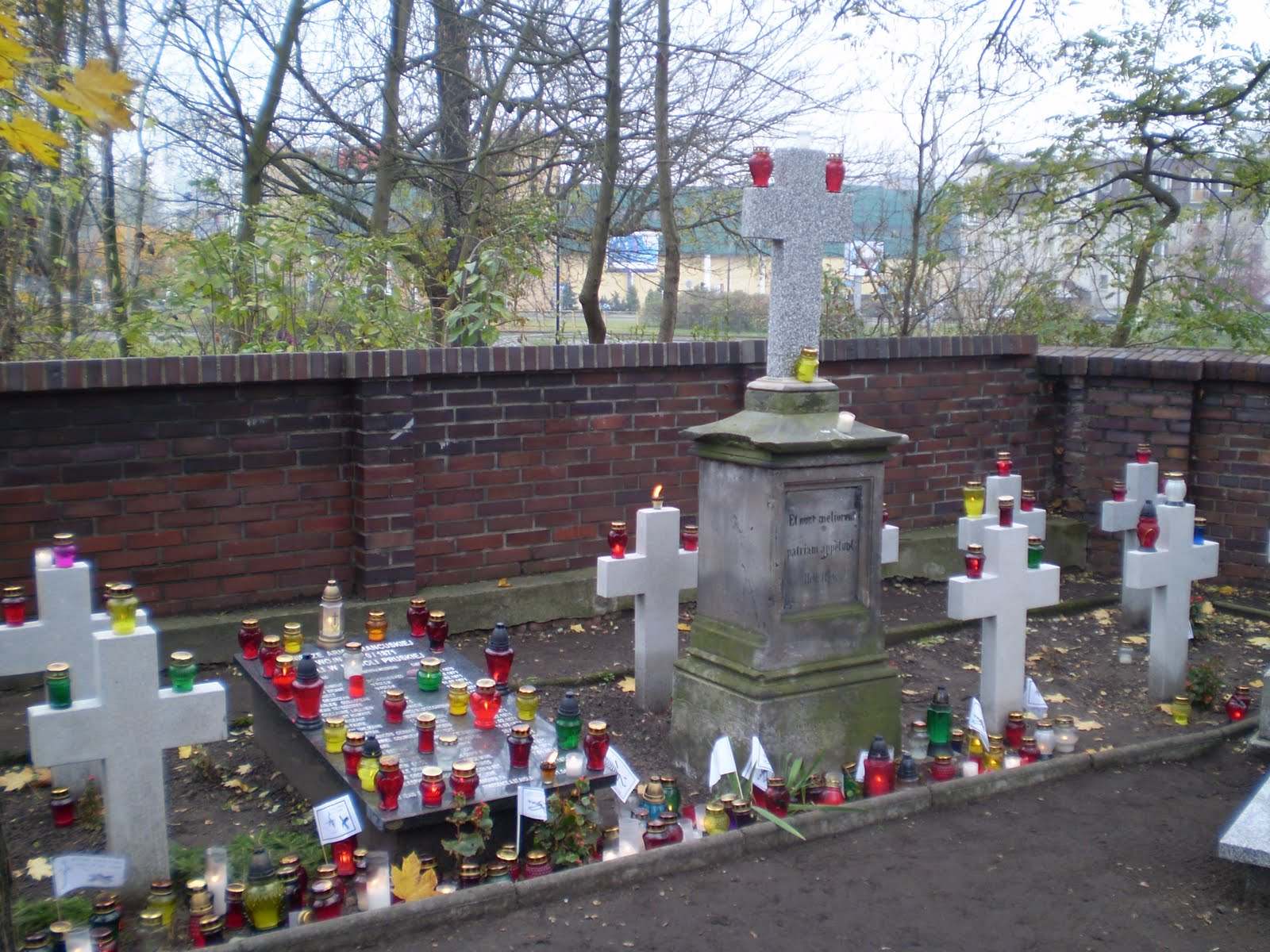
View of the French soldiers' graves corner

The plot is located in the south-eastern corner of the Starofarny Cemetery. It contains the graves of 23 French soldiers who died during the Prussian-French War (1870–1871). At the time prisoners of war, they were moved to then Bromberg and imprisoned in dire conditions in cells located at Friedrichstraße, present day Długa Street.

The first soldier died on 28 December 1870, then 2 in January 1871, 13 in February, 3 in March and 4 in April.

The common grave was created in 1871 and was regularly tended by Poles, even under Prussian rule. Pierre Sorlot, a French assistant professor teaching at the Royal Gymnasium, published an article in the Dziennik Bydgoski (November 1911) expressing his gratitude to the Polish Catholic population (...) who came yesterday to pray at the grave of the French soldiers who died in captivity in Bydgoszcz in 1870 and 1871. At the time, this expression of French and Polish patriotism was condemned by the local authorities and Pierre Sorlot was resettled to Hanover.

On 29 September 1929, a military ceremony of consecration of these graves took place, in the presence of Major Duchon, a representative of the French military mission in Warsaw and local military and civil authorities, including General Thommée. The honorary escort was formed by a company of the 16th Uhlan Regiment.

The corner is today annually honored by the French contingent of NATO units located in Bydgoszcz (i.e. Joint Force Training Centre and 3rd NATO Signal Battalion), every 11 November.

The tombs are represented by anonymous, concrete crosses; on the foreground lays a large stone slab where are inscribed the details of the 23 fallen soldiers.

== Famous burials ==
The Starofarny Cemetery is the burial place of many distinguished Bydgoszcz residents: national activists, politicians, cultural activists, city administration employees, industrialists, craftsmen, social activists, teachers.

Among others, distinguished people buried there include:

Name	Birth year	Death year	Remarks
Edmund Bigoński	1891	1937	Journalist. As a fighter for the rights of Poles in Germany, he was tried ten times for this activity by Prussian authorities. From 1925 onwards, he wrote articles in Bydgoszcz local newspaper Dziennik Bydgoski, dealing with politics and social issues. Member of Parliament (1919–1927) and city councilor (1934–1937).
Eugeniusz Czarliński-Schedlin	1838	1920	Participant to the January Uprising. Doctor of medicine, he was an organizer of the Polish social life during the Prussian period.
Mieczysław Franaszek	1944	2019	Actor. For the second anniversary of his death, a sculpture of him was unveiled on his grave.
Zenon Frydrychowicz	1851	1929	Lawyer. The first president of the District Court in Bydgoszcz.
Gabriel Henner	1884	1949	Lawyer and writer. In 1911, he published in Kraków a volume of poems "Resurectio Carminis". He had been living in Bydgoszcz from 1920. He published, among others, a volume of poems "Stara Bydgoszcz" (1924) and "Księga godziny". In 1921, the Municipal Theatre staged his biblical mystery play "King David".
Teofil Magdziński	1818	1889	Social and national activist.
Sebastian Malinowski	1970	2008	Historian, teacher and social activist. He was the author of numerous articles on the history of Bydgoszcz and the founder and curator of the Bydgoszcz Canal Museum and the Museum of Freedom and Solidarity in Bydgoszcz. He was very active in the cultural and educational life of the region.
Władysław Paciorkiewicz	1876	1925	Mechanical designer. He moved to Bydgoszcz in 1921 where he founded the first Polish typewriter factory. He designed several typing machines.
Leonard Pietraszak	1936	2023	Theater, cinema and TV actor. He played the leading role in Polish series (Czarne chmur, Vabank and Vabank II). Made Honorary Citizen of the city of Bydgoszcz in 2018.
Maksymilian Piotrowski	1813	1875	Professor of the Academy of Fine Arts in then Königsberg, painter, Polish patriot.
Wanda Poznańska	1898	2003	Stenographer and counselor, she took part in important diplomatic events of the 1920s, including the signing of the Treaty of Riga. She served as the personal secretary of Minister Gabriel Narutowicz. Wife of Karol Poznański, consul under the Second Polish Republic. She had been living since 1945 in Montreal. She donated numerous documents and artifacts to the Museum of Polish Diplomacy and Refugees in Bydgoszcz.
Julian Prejs	1820	1904	Journalist. Outstanding national activist during the Prussian Partition, called the "Father of the People's Press in Pomerania".
Robert Proch	1986	2019	Painter. One of the most recognized artists of murals and street art of the young generation, whose artistic mark has permanently enriched the space of many cities in Poland and around the world.
Wanda Rolbieska	1876	1952	Teacher. From 1905, she had been organizing teaching of Polish language and history. Founder and director (1922–1939) of the Municipal Catholic Girls' Gymnasium. Stanisław Rolbieski's sister.
Franciszek Siemiradzki	1870	1948	Engineer. Born in January 1870 in Novogrudok (Belarus), he moved to Bydgoszcz in 1924. Organizer and director of the National School of Arts and Crafts. Social and economic activist.
Jerzy Sulima-Kamiński	1928	2002	Journalist and writer. He worked from 1955 to 1990 at the editorial office of Polish Radiow. Author of radio plays, feuilletons, literary reviews, novels and the three-volume Bydgoszcz saga Most Królowej Jadwigi (English: Queen Jadwiga's Bridge).
Józef Trajtler	1877	1923	Engineer and teacher. Graduate of the Budapest University of Technology, engineer specialist in railway construction. He had living from 1919 in Bydgoszcz as a senior government adviser, then as head of the branch of the Gdańsk Directorate of State Railways.
Henryk Umbreit	1867	1942	Activist in Wrocław. He moved in 1924 to Bydgoszcz where he bought the pharmacy "Pod Lwem" with his brother Piotr.
Emil Warmiński	1881	1909	Doctor native of Bydgoszcz, very successful activist. Buried in the family crypt.
Stanisław Warmiński	1847	1905	Physician and traveler. co-founder and director of the Hospital for Infectious Diseases in Bydgoszcz at Świętego Floriana Street. He was the uncle and tutor of Emil Warmiński. Buried in the family crypt.
Franciszek Witecki	1854	1922	Master tailor, Polish social and national activist. He founded and long-time chaired the "Halka" Singing Society in Bydgoszcz. He established as well the Industrial Bank at Długa Street.
Edward Woyniłłowicz	1847	1928	Landowner, entrepreneur, philanthropist and public figure. He funded of the Red Church on the Independence Square in Minsk.

== See also ==
- Bydgoszcz
- Nowofarny Cemetery in Bydgoszcz

== Bibliography ==
- Zbigniew, Woźniak (1996). Bydgoskie cmentarze. Bydgoska Gospodarka Komunalna [Bydgoszcz cemeteries. Bydgoszcz Municipal Economy] (in Polish). Bydgoszcz: Instytut Wydawniczy "Świadectwo". pp. 87–88. ISBN 83-85860-37-1.
- Jeleniewski, Marek K. (2022). Ilustrowany przewodnik po cmentarzu Starofarmnym w Bydgoszczy [An illustrated guide to the Starofarny cemetery in Bydgoszcz] (in Polish). Bydgoszcz: Margrafsen. pp. 87–88. ISBN 978-83-66844-23-0.
