= Bielczyny =

- Village
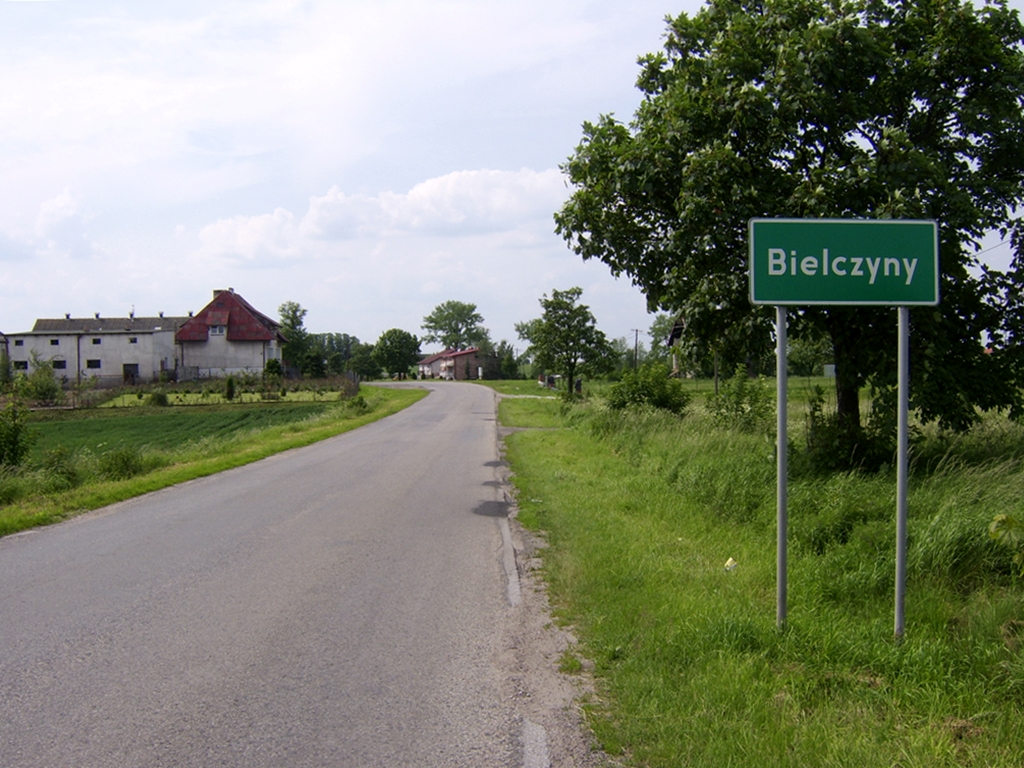
- Entrance to the village

- Location within Poland
- Coordinates: 53°12′N 18°34′E
- Country: Poland
- Voivodeship: Kuyavian-Pomeranian
- County: Toruń
- Gmina: Chełmża
- First mentioned: 1222
- Time zone: UTC+1 (CET)
  - Summer (DST): UTC+2 (CEST)
- Vehicle registration: CTR

Bielczyny [bjɛlˈt͡ʂɨnɨ] is a village in the administrative district of Gmina Chełmża, within Toruń County, Kuyavian-Pomeranian Voivodeship, in north-central Poland. It is located in Chełmno Land within the historic region of Pomerania.

== History ==
The oldest known mention of the village comes from a document of Duke Konrad I of Masovia from 1222.

A medieval monastery in the village once housed Jutta of Kulmsee, a devout woman aristocrat who became a nun after the death of her husband on pilgrimage to Jerusalem and chose to live in an abandoned building in this village under the protection of the Teutonic Knights, including some her relatives in the State of the Teutonic Order. Later considered the patron saint of Prussia, Jutta was buried in the nearby cathedral at Chełmża (Kulmsee), and both this town and her tomb became pilgrimage destinations.

The village was reincorporated to the Kingdom of Poland by King Casimir IV Jagiellon in 1454, and after the subsequent Thirteen Years' War, the longest of all Polish–Teutonic wars, the Teutonic Knights renounced any claims to the area and recognized it as part of Poland.

During the German occupation of Poland (World War II), Bielczyny was one of the sites of executions of Poles, carried out by the Germans in 1939 as part of the Intelligenzaktion. In November 1940, the German Schutzpolizei carried out expulsions of Poles, who were placed in a transit camp in nearby Toruń, and then either deported to the General Government in the more eastern part of German-occupied Poland or sent to forced labour, while their houses and farms were handed over to German colonists as part of the Lebensraum policy.
