= Julian Prejs =

Polish journalist (1820–1904)

- Julian Walenty Prejs
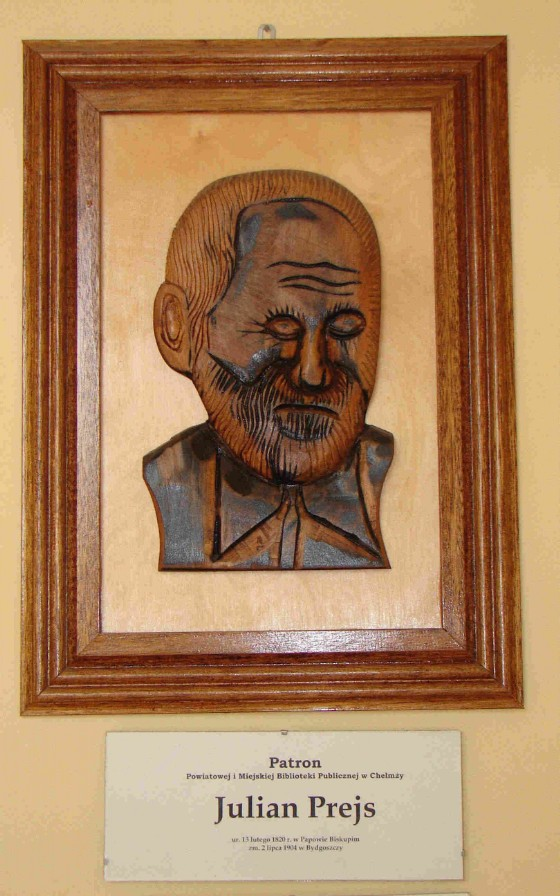
- Carving of Julian Walenty Prejs, Chełmża Library
- Born: 13 February 1820; Papowo Biskupie, Kingdom of Prussia
- Died: 4 July 1904 (aged 84); Bromberg, German Empire
- Resting place: Starofarny Cemetery in Bydgoszcz
- Other names: Sjerp-Polaczek
- Occupations: Teacher, writer, journalist, publisher, national activist
- Known for: Weekly "Biedaczek"

Julian Walenty Prejs (1820–1904), aka Sjerp-Polaczek, Polaczek-Biedaczek, Bez kosy Wojaczek, was a Polish teacher, folk writer, national activist, journalist and publisher, often called the "Father of the folk press in Pomerania".

== Biography ==
=== Youth years ===
Julian was born on 13 February 1820 in Papowo Biskupie near Chełmża, then part of the Kingdom of Prussia. He was the son of Józef Kazimierz (who died in 1849), an organist and a landlord, and Anna née Paliwodzińska.

He started to receive private home lessons - including Latin taught by a Franciscan friar. He then attended the City School in Chełmno and the Toruń gymnasium from October 1835. In the summer of 1840, he went to Congress Poland territory. In 1842, Julian was admitted to the University of Wrocław, in the department of philosophy. From November 1842 to July 1843, he was a member of the Literary and Slavic Society (Polish: Towarzystwo Literacko-Słowiańskie) in Wrocław. He did not complete his studies and moved again to Congress Poland land in 1844. In 1845, he found a position of private tutor in Warsaw.

Involved in an underground operation, Julian was threatened to be arrested and had to return to Chełmno at the beginning of 1847. He shared these experiences in his poem "Dola Śmiertelnika" ("The fate of the mortal"), published in the journal "Przyjaciel Ludu" (issue Nr.3, 1847): there, he expressed his doubts about the effectiveness of the armed insurrection against occupying forces.

The Prussian authorities, aware of his political inclinations, prevented him from taking the state examination, hence barring him the access to teaching positions. From this juncture, Prejs then devoted entirely his activity to educational work among the common people.

=== Life in Toruń ===
Julian Prejs published his first literary works in 1845–1847 in Poznań's periodical "Kościół i Szkoła" ("Church and School") and in Leszno's Friend of the People.

He had an important literary activity during the Springtime of Nations. In the mid-1848, he published the brochure of a popular political magazine entitled "Ludownik" ("Commoner") but resigned from publishing it, due to the substantial stamp costs. From July 1848 on, he collaborated with the "Szkoła Narodowa" ("National School"), printed in Chełmno.

He then used a pseudonym, "Sjerp-Polaczka", an anagram from his family name: his articles advocated equality for all people, social solidarity and Polish nobility leadership, while his poems aroused patriotic feelings.

At the same period, from October 1848 to June 1850, he edited and published in Toruń is own journal entitled "Biedaczek, czyli Mały i Tani Tygodnik dla Biednego Ludu" ("The poor man, or the Small and Cheap Weekly for the Poor People."). From 1849 on, it was as well distributed in Chełmża. This periodical was pivotal in awakening Polish national awareness in Pomerania. "Biedaczek" was initially printed by a German printing house before shifting to a Polish-owned printing house in April 1849. The latter was founded by Prejs with the help of some landowners, priests and the Polish League, an organization founded on 25 June 1848 in Berlin by Polish envoys to the Prussian parliament, aiming to defend Polish interests by legal means. "Biedaczek" was the first periodical in the entire Pomerania aiming to shape the national consciousness of the local peasantry, the petty bourgeoisie and the commoners alike. It also touched upon the specific topics of Kashubia and Masuria.

In 1850, facing more and more difficulties raised from the Prussian authorities, Julian had to liquidate his enterprise. He tried to fight back by publishing, on 1 April 1849, another separate magazine for women, "Siostrzanka" ("Little sister"), which did not find its audience and soon collapsed.

He published additionally separate writings, such as:

- "Śpiewnik polski, czyli zbiór pieśni, śpiewów i śpiewek narodowych" ("Polish Songbook, or a collection of national songs and chants") (1849);
- "Jeszcze Polska nie zginęła, Pieśń nowa" ("Poland Has Not Yet Perished, New Song") (1850);
- "Miłość ojczyzny i nikczemność – Powieść Ludowa" (`"Love of the motherland and wickedness – a People's novel") (1850);
- "Doktor Marcinek, doktor cudowny, doktor cudotwórca" ("Doktor Marcinek, miraculous doctor, miracle worker doctor") (1850), dedicated to Karol Marcinkowski, a famous physician from Poznań, whom Prejs considered as a model of social and national activist.

=== Life in Chełmża ===
At the turn of 1849, Julian Prejs applied to the city council of Chełmża with a request to grant permission to establish a printing house. With the municipal approval, he moved to Chełmża, where he founded the "Drukarnię Polsko- Ludową Juliana Prejsa w Chełmży" ("Julian Prejs Polish-People's Printing House in Chełmża"). This plant was then used from 3 October 1849, to publish "Biedaczek".

Once settled up, Prejs intended also to set up a Polish bookshop rental in the city, as well as publishing other magazines: a humorous weekly in German, a magazine for rural farmers and a women's magazine.

However, Prussian authorities had decided to change their policy regarding publishing, considering it reactionary. The new press law introduced high cash deposits, forcing Prejs to stop publishing "Biedaczek" on 29 June 1850. In August 1850, he was even denied permission to run his printing house.

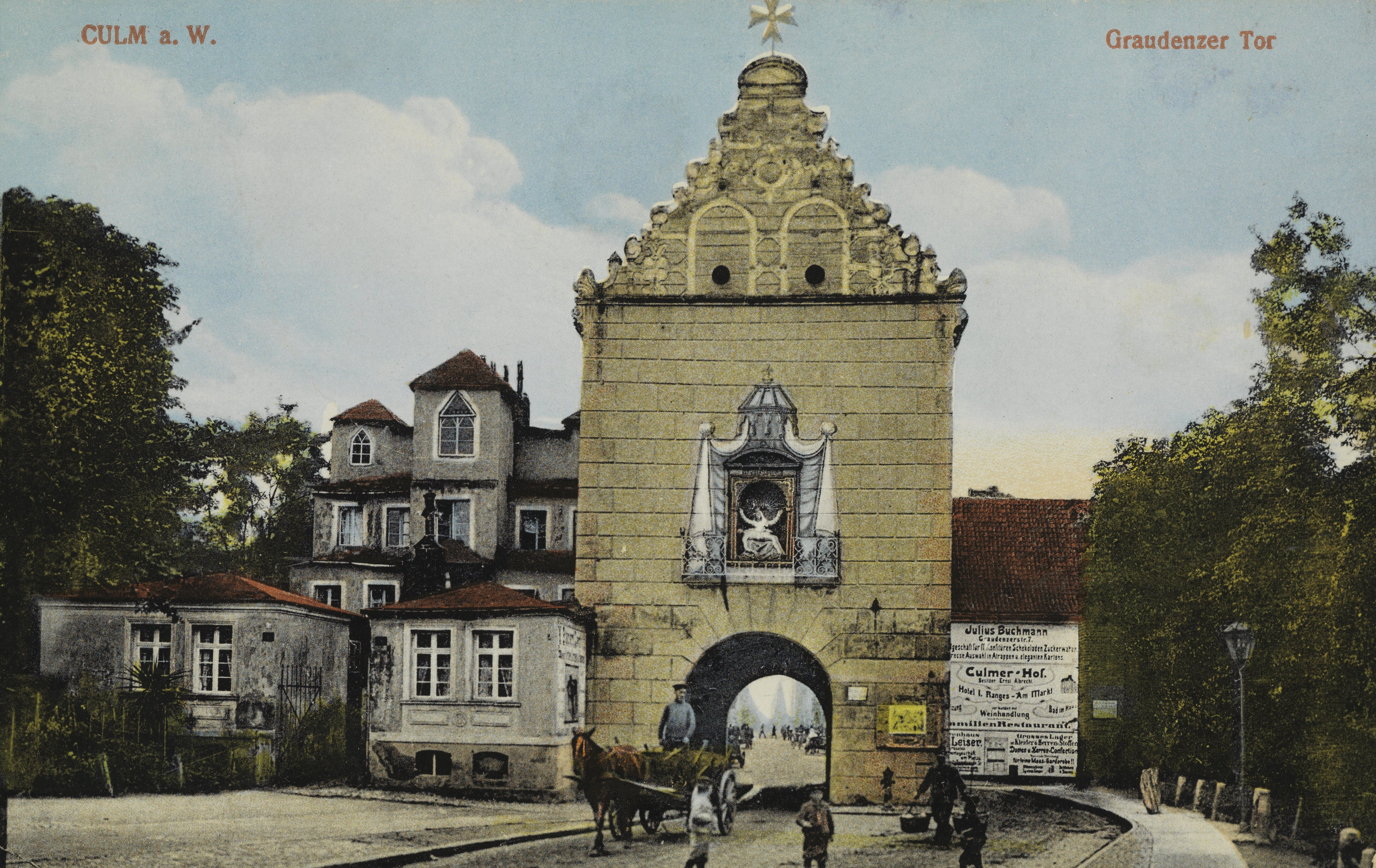
Prejs boarding house (nonexistent today), on the left of the gate. 1914

=== Life in Chełmno ===
In 1855, he lived in Chełmno, maintaining contacts with August Schneider's publishing house in Toruń and probably anonymously with Chełmno's journal A resident of the Vistula. From 1855 to 1865, Prejs started to operate a boarding house in Chełmno, for the students of the local gymnasium.

Soon he got contacts in Bydgoszcz, where from October 1860 to March 1861, he published 5 issues of the calendar magazine "Wszechbrat Bracki, pismo dla bractw i stowarzyszeń kościelnych a szczególnie Bractw Trzeźwości świętej" (""Wszechbrat Bracki, a magazine for church fraternities and associations, especially the Fraternities of Holy Sobriety").

Another periodic had a longer history: "Sjerp-Polaczka Kalendarz Katolicko-Polski" ("Sjerp-Polaczka Catholic-Polish Calendar") was published from 1861 to 1877, thanks to his links with a Toruń-based printer, Ernest Lambeck. This journal had a great importance for the local development of education.

Nothing is known with certainty about Julian's activities during the January uprising (1863-1864).

=== Life in Bydgoszcz ===
Julian Prejs settled in Bydgoszcz in 1865.

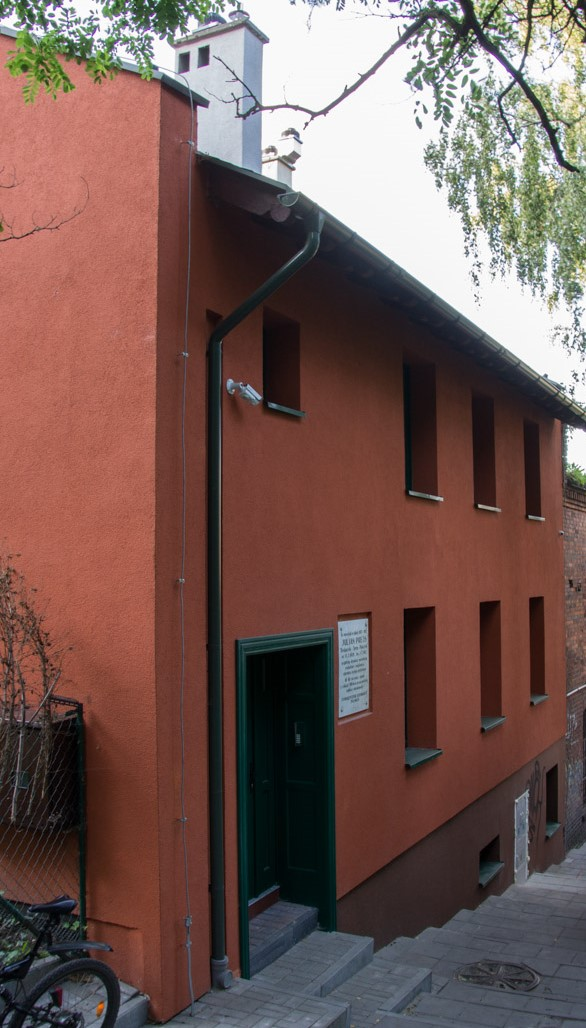
Julian Prejs house at 2 Terasy street, Bydgoszcz

He kept editing the "Sjerp-Polaczka Kalendarz Katolicko-Polski" while taking different jobs to get a basic income, such as fishing in the nearby lakes. He lived in extreme poverty and was barely able to feed his family.

However, he never let writing aside. In 1884, he came under critics from Poznań periodic "Goniec Wielkopolski" and Hieronim Derdowski, a Kashubian writer. In reaction, he started a folk newspaper in Inowrocław, "Kujawiak". The journal folded three months after its beginnings and Julian Prejs returned to Bydgoszcz where he remained until his death.

He collaborated with Stanisław Tomaszewski, a printer and publisher of newspapers "Straż Polska" (Polish Guard) (1891–1894) and Gazeta Bydgoska. In addition, Prejs collaborated with other magazines, such as "Pochodnia Inowrocławska" ("The Inowrocław Torch"), also printed by Tomaszewski. He compiled as well the history of Saint Roch's and Saint Anne's brotherhoods. Julian rarely got paid for his work, calling himself jokingly "The Generous Thomas" (Polish: Szczodry Tomasz).

Apart from his writing activity, he actively participated in the Polish social life of Bydgoszcz denizens. On 27 October 1872, together with Teofil Magdziński, they created the Towarzystwo Przemysłowego w Bydgoszczy ('Industrial Society in Bydgoszcz'), bringing together local notables, craftsmen, workers and small industrialists.

Furthermore, on 3 March 1883, Prejs co-founded Bydgoszcz choir "Halka". He was a member of the supervisory board of the "Bank Ludowy".

He lived in Bydgoszcz for almost 40 years. He loved this town and its river Brda, he nicknamed "ubrdany", ("imagine, dream up"). His house is still preserved at 2 Terasy street.

He seldom took care of himself, spending the end of his life in poverty and in almost complete oblivion. In 1902, when Julian fell into extreme dire, appeals appeared in Poznań and Pomeranian newspapers to rescue the elderly, dying writer.

Prejs died on 2 July 1904, at the age of 84. He was buried in Bydgoszcz Starofarny Cemetery.

The funerals were attended by councilors from various parts of the country: Wiktor Kulerski, the publisher of Gazeta Grudziądzka gave the farewell speech.Julian Prejs devoted his entire life to preserve the Polish language at a time when the Prussian state and the German language was prevailing. He always strived to have his works accessible for simple audience in a very accessible way.

=== Personal life and family ===
Julian Prejs was married to Karolina, née Gollnik.

They had two sons: Franciszek and Wiktor.

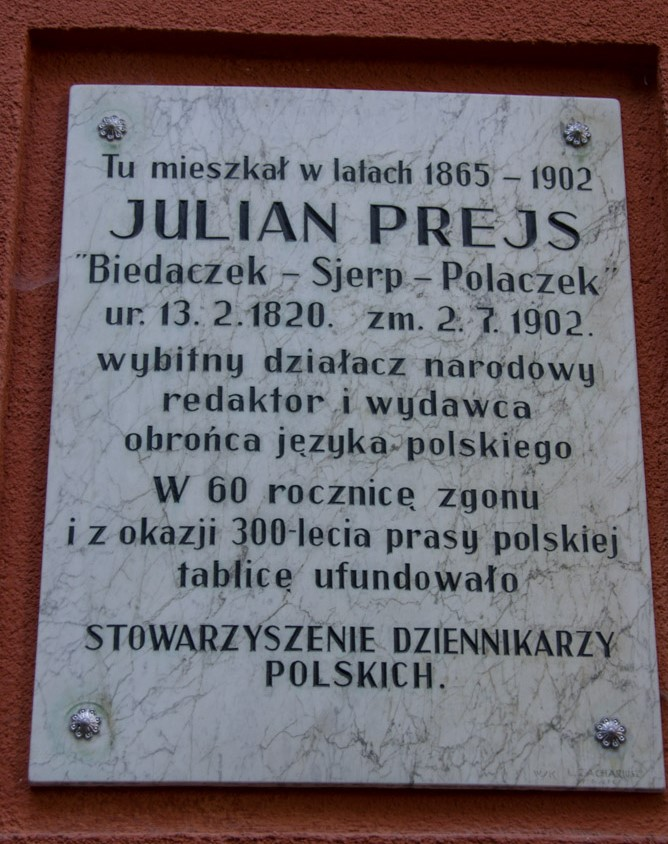
Prejs Commemorative Plaque at 2 Terasy street

== Commemorations ==
Two streets have been named after Prejs:

- in the Fordon district, Bydgoszcz;
- in the Na Skarpie district, Toruń.

Julian Prejs is the patron of the Powiat and municipal library of Chełmża, located at 4 Rynek street.

At the initiative of Society of Bydgoszcz city lovers, a commemorative plaque funded by the Pomeranian Branch of the Association of Polish Journalists has been unveiled in 1962, placed on the wall of his house in Bydgoszcz at 2 Terasy street.

The building, left abandoned in the late 1990s, was entirely renovated at the end of 2013.

Since September 2015, the journalist's former home houses the local seat of the Polish Scouting Association.

For the 200th anniversary of Julian Prejs birth, a celebration took place in February 2020, on his tombstone, in the house at 2 Terasy and at the Garrison church. It was organized by Aleksandra Poeplau (great-great-great-granddaughter of the journalist), Polish scouts and members of the "Society of Bydgoszcz city lovers".

== Gallery ==
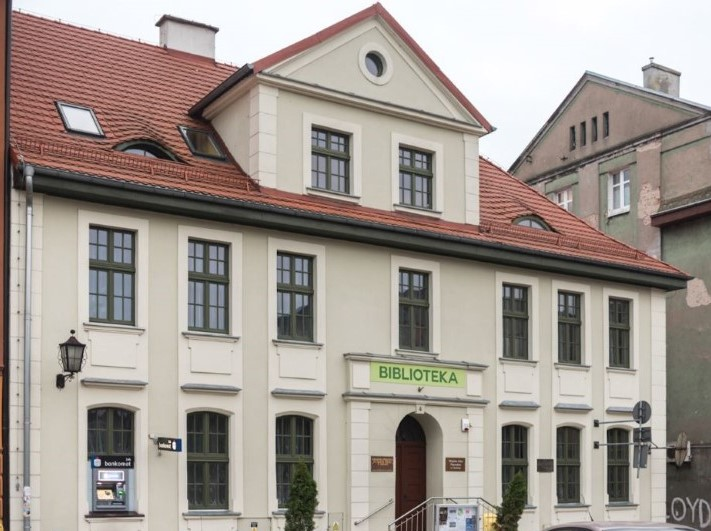
Julian Prejs Library in Chełmża

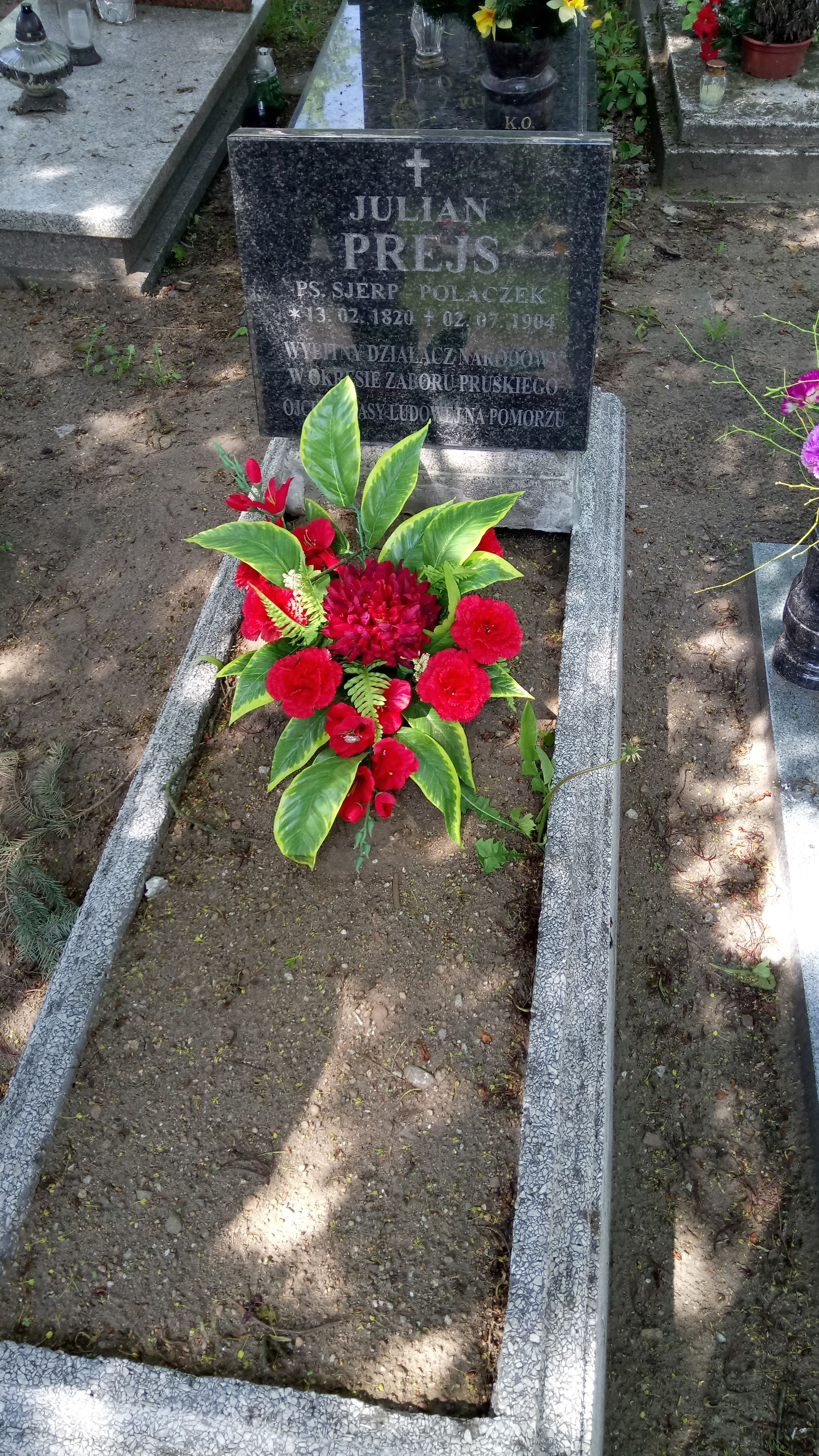
Julian Prejs tombstone, at Bydgoszcz Starofarny cemetery

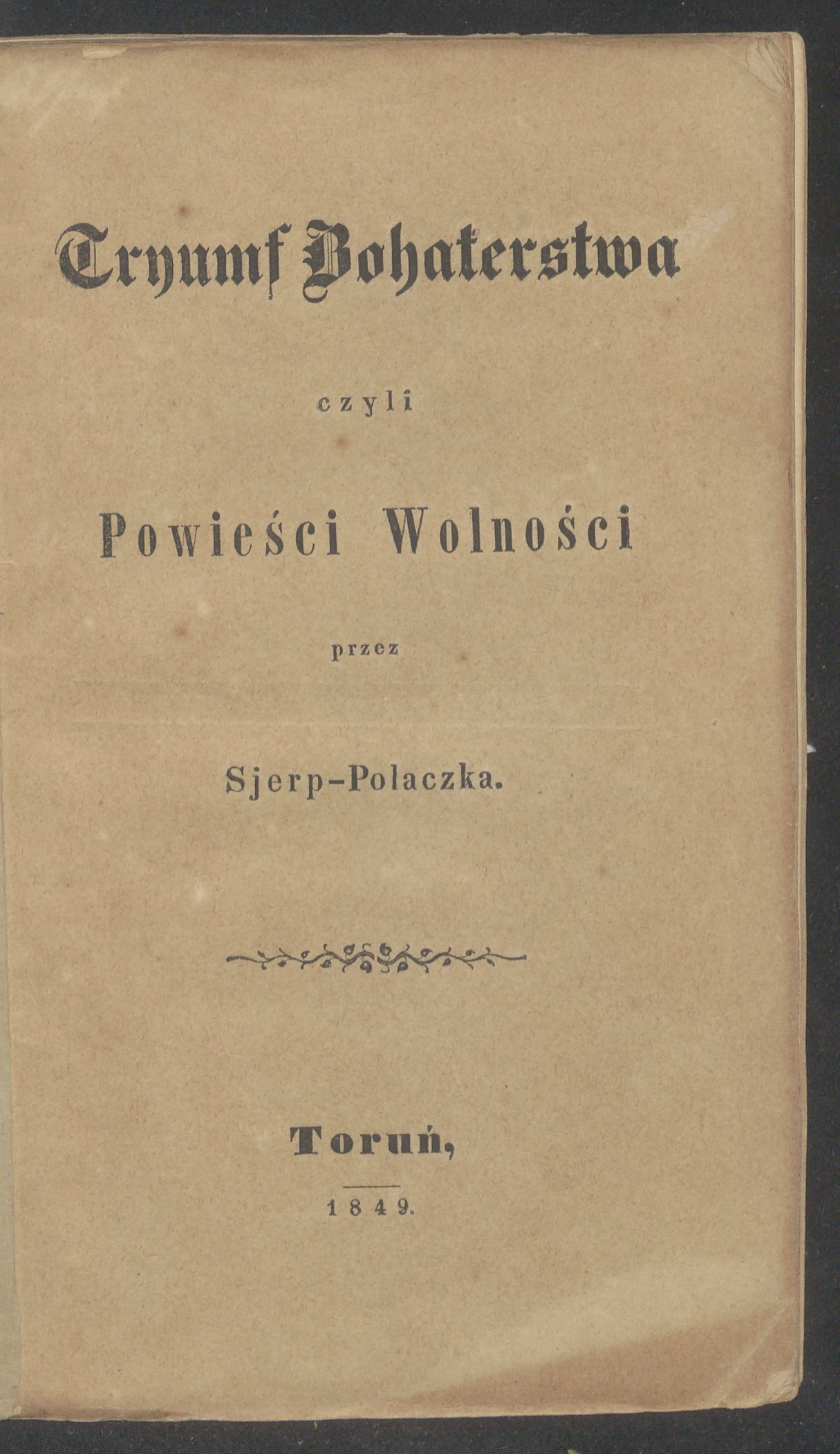
"Tryumf Bohaterstwa" ("The triumph of Heroism"), published under his pseudonym Sjerp-Polaska

== See also ==
- Bydgoszcz
- Chełmża
- Teofil Magdziński
- List of Polish people

== Bibliography ==
- (in Polish) Błażejewski, Stanisław; Kutta, Janusz; Romaniuk, Marek (1996). Bydgoski Słownik Biograficzny. Tom III. Bydgoszcz: Kujawsko-Pomorskie Towarzystwo Kulturalne Wojewódzki Ośrodek Kultury. pp. 115–116. ISBN 8385327320.
- (in Polish) Kolberg, Oskar (1965). DZIEŁA WSZYSTKIE, Pomorze... Kraków: Ludowa Spółdzielnia Wydawnicza. p. 546. ISBN 8385327320.
