= Stefan Wincenty Frelichowski =

Polish priest and martyr

Blessed Stefan Wincenty Frelichowski
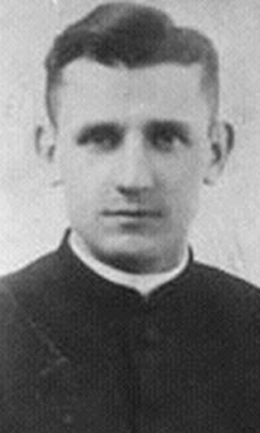

Martyr
- Born: 22 January 1913; Chełmża, Kujawsko-Pomorskie, Congress Poland
- Died: 23 February 1945 (aged 32); Dachau concentration camp, Nazi Germany
- Venerated in: Roman Catholic Church
- Beatified: 7 June 1999, Toruń, Poland by Pope John Paul II
- Feast: 22 February

Stefan Wincenty Frelichowski (22 January 1913 – 23 February 1945) was a Polish Roman Catholic priest. He was part of the scouts and was affiliated with several other groups during the course of his ecclesial education, though he maintained strong links to these groups after his ordination to the priesthood. He was arrested not long after World War II began and the Gestapo moved him to several concentration camps before sending him to Dachau where he died from disease.

Frelichowski was beatified in Poland in 1999.

== Life ==
Stefan Wincenty Frelichowski was born on 22 January 1913 in Chełmża as the third of seven children to the baker Ludwik Frelichowski and Marta Olszewska. His siblings were: Czesław, Leonard (called Leszek) (then himself after), Eleanor, Stefania and Marcjanna Marta.

In 1923 he began his high school studies at Pelpin where on 26 May 1927 he was admitted into the Sodality of the Blessed Virgin. He joined the scouts on 21 March 1927 and he later Frelichowski served as its patrol leader and later as the troop leader; on 26 June 1927 he was promoted to a different scout rank. In June 1931 he graduated from high school and then went on to commence his studies to become a priest. He was an active member of the Scout Club while he underwent his ecclesial studies. Furthermore, he was an active member of the Christian Life group in Chełmża. Since he was nine, he had been an Altar server. During his education for the priesthood in Pelpin, he was active in the temperance movement and collaborated with Caritas.

On 14 March 1937, he received his ordination to the priesthood in the Pelpin Cathedral from Bishop Stanisław Wojciech Okoniewski. He first served the bishop as an aide and then served as a priest in Pelpin and in Toruń before continuing his studies at the Lwów college. In Toruń he was responsible for the parish press and from 1 July 1938 was the vicar of the Assumption Parish Church. In 1938 he became the leader of the Old Scouts and the chaplain of the scout district of Pomerania.

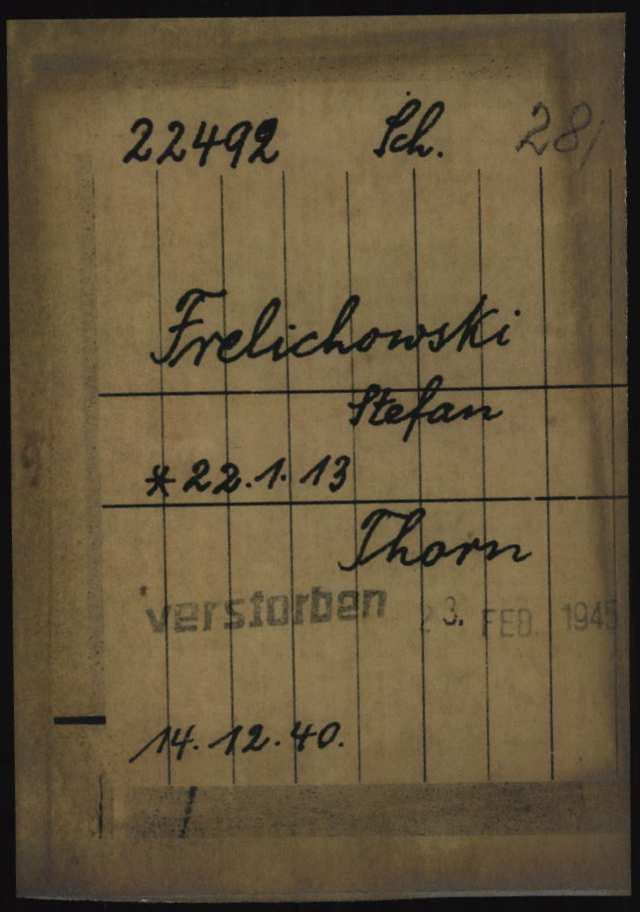
Registration card of Stefan Wincenty Frelichowski as a prisoner at Dachau concentration camp

The Gestapo arrested him on 11 September 1939 along with all parish priests in his area and released most of them save for him on 12 September. On 18 October 1939, he was imprisoned in the Fort VII camp on a temporary basis before being sent on 8 January 1940 with around 200 prisoners to another camp. On 10 January 1940 he was sent to the concentration camp at Stutthof and then later on 6 April to Grenzdorf and Sachsenhausen before being sent to Dachau as his final destination on 13 December 1940.

Frelichowski contracted typhus while tending to prisoners who had the disease, and he also contracted pneumonia. He died on 23 February 1945, and his remains were lined in a white sheet decorated with flowers before he was cremated. But before that, the prisoner Stanisław Bieniek made a death mask and a cast of the late priest's right hand.

== Beatification ==
The beatification cause started in a diocesan process spanning from 1964 until closure on 18 February 1995, at which point the Congregation for the Causes of Saints validated it in Rome on 12 May 1995. The formal introduction came on 12 November 1993, and he was titled as a Servant of God. The postulation sent the positio to the Congregation in 1998. Theologians approved it later on 15 December 1998, as did the Congregation on 16 February 1999. Pope John Paul II approved his beatification on 26 March 1999 after confirming that Frelichowski died in odium fidei ("in hatred of the faith") and beatified him on 7 June 1999.

On 22 March 2002, Frelichoski was declared patron for Polish scouts.
