= Chełmża =

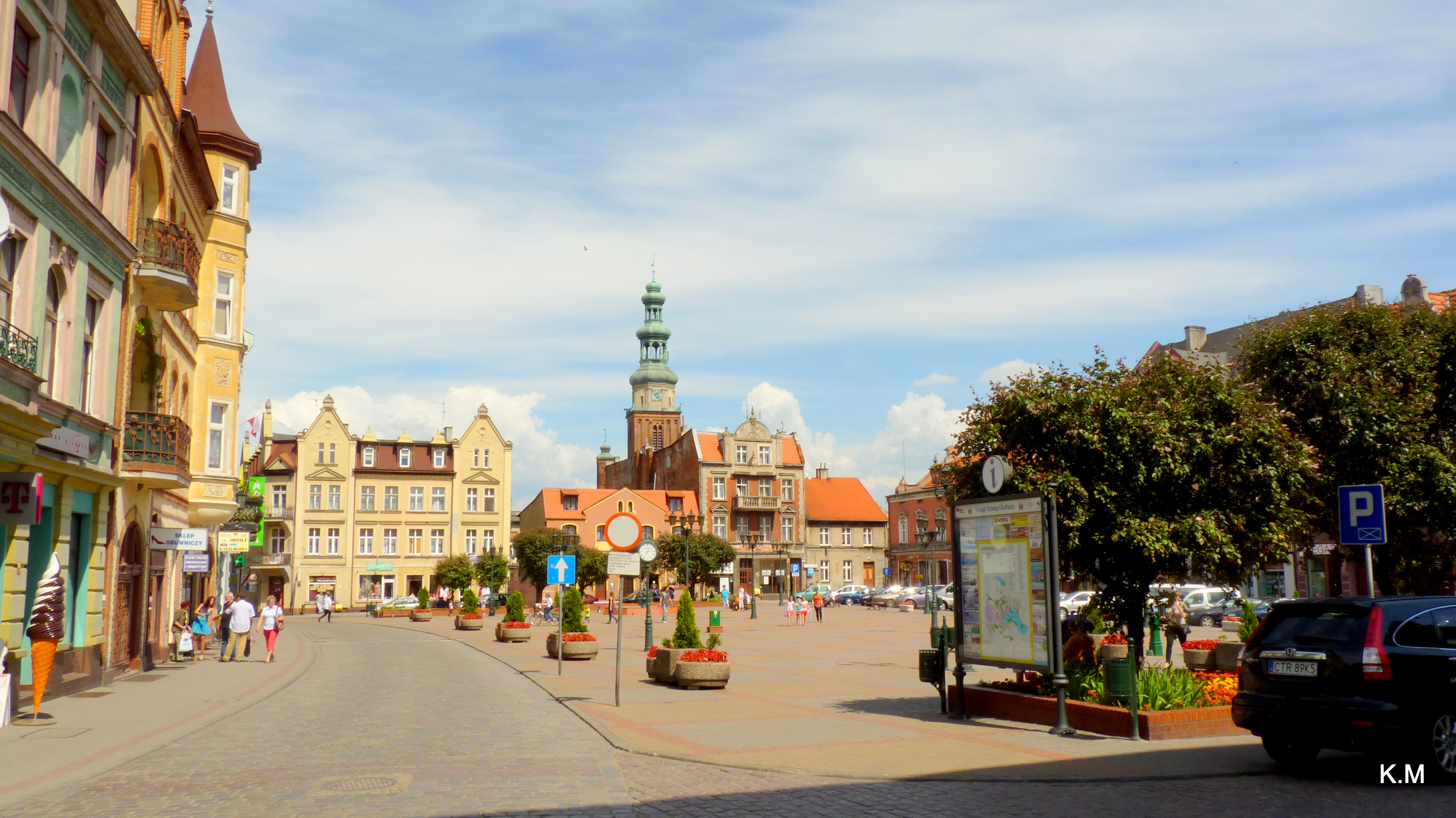
- Chełmża market square

- Coat of arms

- Location within Poland
- Coordinates: 53°11′5″N 18°36′15″E
- Country: Poland
- Voivodeship: Kuyavian-Pomeranian
- County: Toruń
- Gmina: Chełmża (urban gmina)
- Town rights: 1251

Government
  - Mayor: Paweł Polikowski

Area
  - Total: 7.84 km^{2} (3.03 sq mi)

Population (31 December 2021)
  - Total: 14,181
  - Density: 1,810/km^{2} (4,680/sq mi)
- Postal code: 87-140
- Area code: +48 56
- Vehicle registration: CTR
- Website: http://www.chelmza.pl

Chełmża [ˈxɛu̯mʐa]; (German: Kulmsee, earlier Culmsee), is a town in northern Poland, in the Toruń County, Kuyavian-Pomeranian Voivodeship. It is one of the historic centers of Chełmno Land.

== Geography ==
The town Chełmża is placed at the lake named Jezioro Chełmżyńskie (area 2.71 km^{2}), earlier the lake itself was named Culmsee and therefore eponym of the town, that earlier had the name Culmsee, too (see History).

== History ==
The first signs of settlement date to 10,000 BC when reindeer hunters made their visits to the area. Around 4500 BC the first agricultural settlements were founded. Goth tribes also moved through the area on their trek from Scandinavia and North Germany. Visible signs of existence of the Old Prussians also exist. Around the 7th century the Slavic Lechitic tribe of Goplans arrived in the area.

=== Middle Ages ===
In the time of first Piasts and the formation of Poland, Chełmno Land and the settlement of Łoza (now the town of Chełmża) was incorporated into Chełmno castellany. After the death of Bolesław III Wrymouth in 1138 it was handed over to his son Bolesław IV the Curly – as part of Masovia within Piast-ruled Poland. The fights with nearby Old Prussian tribes resulted in several raids that destroyed the area. In the 13th century the ruler of the area was Konrad I who in order to Christianize the Old Prussians brought a missionary Bishop Christian of Oliva. The bishop was granted a number of possession including the settlement of Łoza. Later Teutonic Knights were granted local lands to support the bishop by military means. However, in time the knights took over the possession of Christian's diocese, dividing the area into four dioceses in 1243, including the Roman Catholic Diocese of Chełmno. At the end of 1245 Heidenreich of the Diocese of Chełmno (Culm) became the bishop of diocese. He picked Łoza as place of his stay. It was during that time that Łoza received its new name Culmense and became part of the residence of the bishop who resided and governed in Warmia from 1245 to 1263. In 1251 (before July 22) Bishop Heidenreich bestowed city rights to Łoza and renamed it Culmsee (Kulmsee).

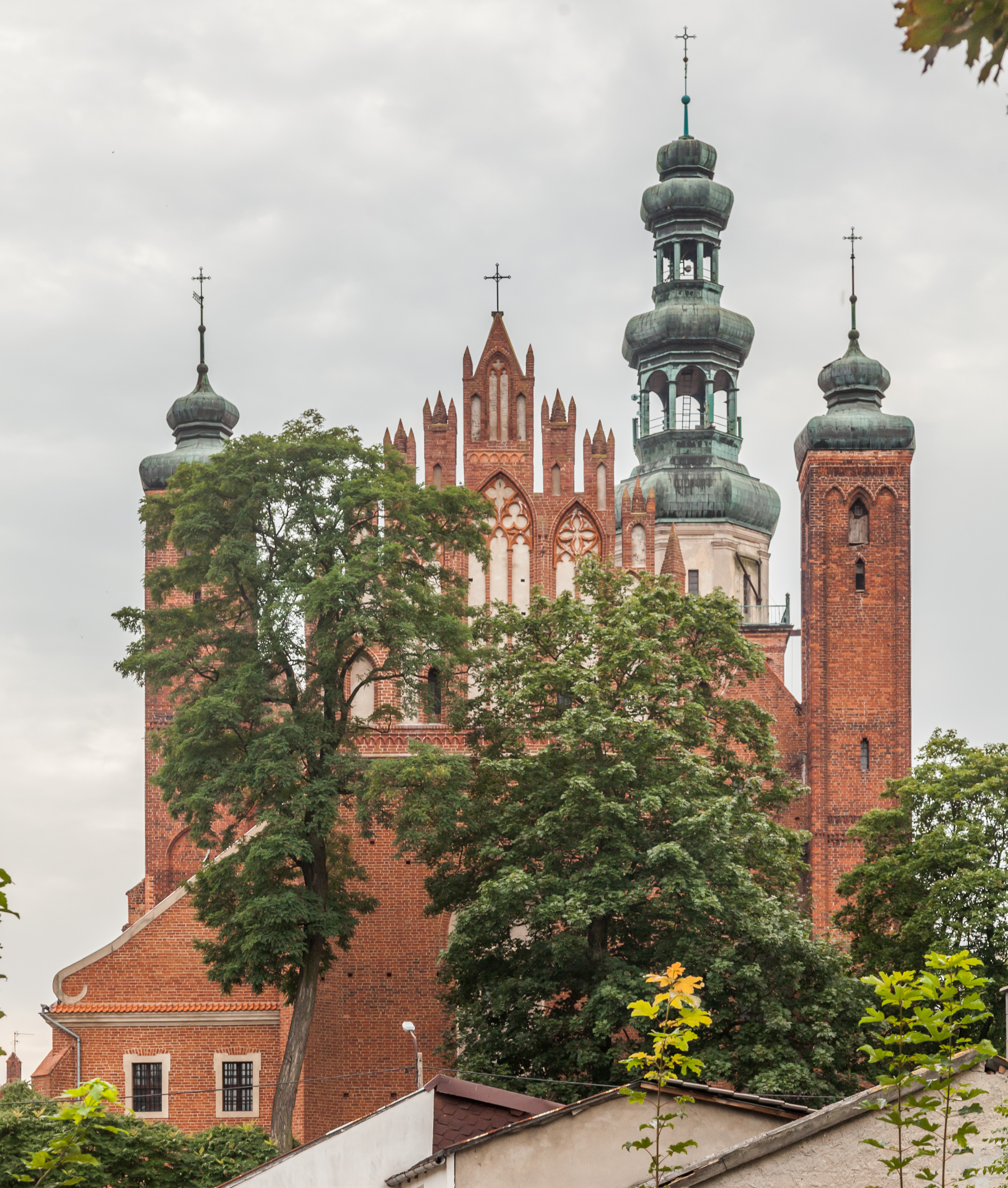
Chełmża Co-Cathedral overlooking the Old Town

On July 22, the bishop also founded the cathedral which was built starting in 1254. Bishop Heidenreich received permissions for his undertakings directly from the pope. Later, in 1255 the four dioceses of Prussia, including the Bishopric of Culm were put under the jurisdiction of the Archbishopric of Riga as metropolitan.

In the 1250s Jutta von Sangerhausen came to live in the region and settled at Bielczyny. In 1256 she founded the St. George church. It was her wish to be interred at the town's cathedral-church and upon her death in 1260 her wish was granted. The 5 May is her memorial day. The nearby village of Bielczyny and the cathedral soon became a destination for pilgrims to her shrine.

The town witnessed many wars and uprisings. The nearby Old Prussians besieged the town in 1268 and 1273. In the 14th century, papal verdicts ordered the restoration of the territory to Poland, however, the Teutonic Knights did not comply and continued to occupy it. In the 15th century the town experienced the wars between Teutonic Knights and Poland. In 1410 the Polish army took the town and the bishop of Chełmno Arnold Stapil made a tribute to Polish King Władysław II Jagiełło. In 1422 Chełmża was taken again by the forces of the king and destroyed in large part. In 1454, the town joined the anti-Teutonic Prussian Confederation, upon the request of which Polish King Casimir IV Jagiellon re-incorporated the region and town into Poland that same year, what was eventually confirmed following the Thirteen Years' War in 1466. Synods of the Roman Catholic Diocese of Chełmno were held in Chełmża several times between the 14th and 17th centuries.

=== Early modern period ===
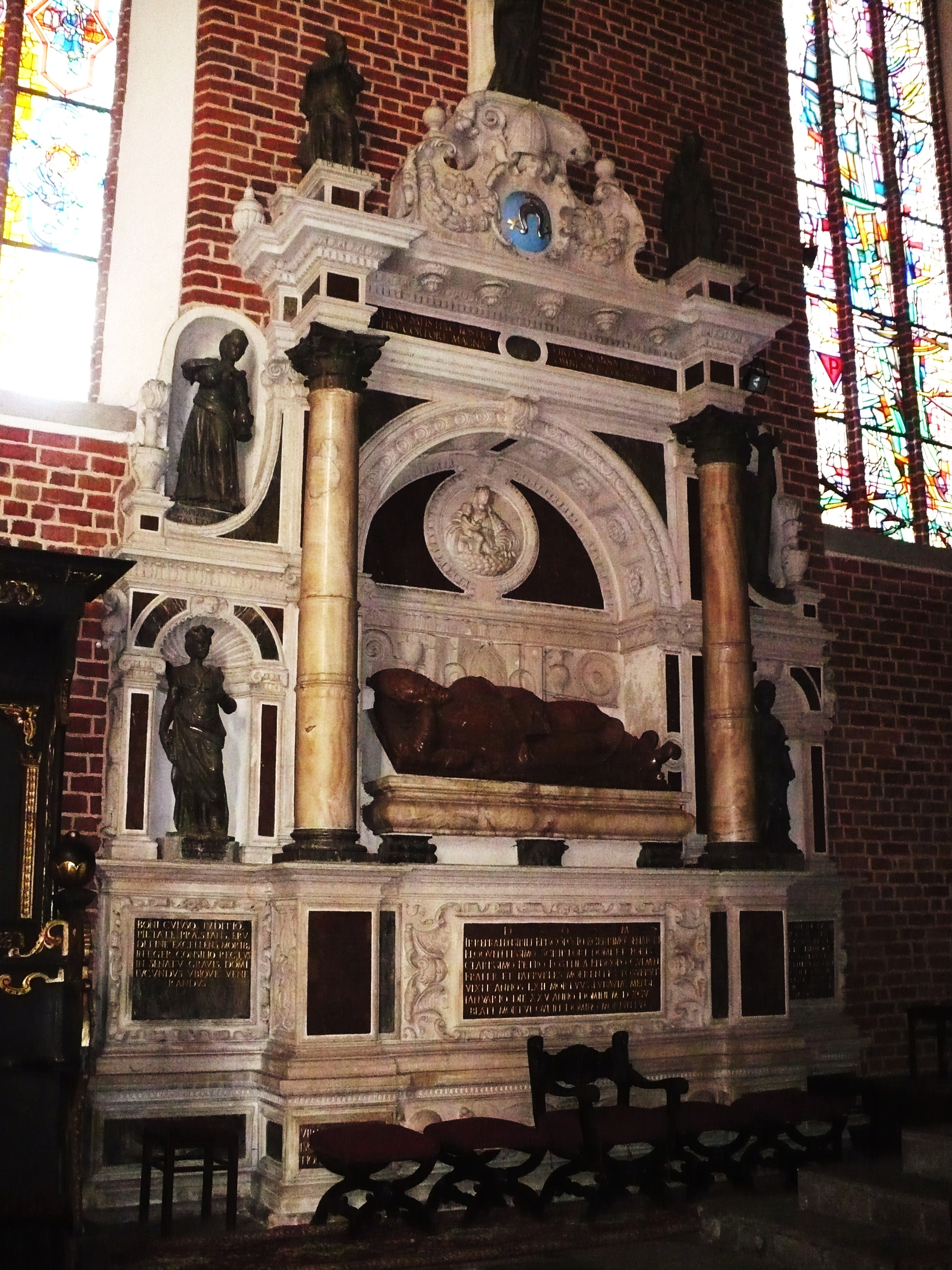
Renaissance tombstone of Bishop Piotr Kostka in the Co-Cathedral

In 1552, Chełmża was visited by Polish King Sigismund II Augustus. After Riga's dissolution in 1566 the bishops of Chełmno attended the councils of the ecclesiastical province of the metropolitan of Gniezno. This practice was recognised by the Holy See by the Bull De salute animarum in 1821, when the Diocese of Chełmno became de jure a suffragan of the Archdiocese of Gniezno. Chełmno diocese was enlarged on that occasion (Górzno, Krajna and Działdowo). In 1621 and 1627 the town hosted the court of Polish King Sigismund III Vasa along with Prince Władysław.

The Swedish invasions of Poland of 1626–29 and 1655–60 brought devastation to the town. In the beginning of the 18th-century Russian, Saxon, Swedish armies went through the area along with supporters of Stanisław Leszczyński. The constant warfare led to the fall of the city, and its breaking point was reached due a plague that happened in years 1708–1710. A next series of wars in 1733–1735 and in 1756–1763 along with fire in 1762 almost completely destroyed the city.

=== Late modern period ===
After the First Partition of Poland on 15 September 1772 Chełmża was taken over by the Kingdom of Prussia. At that time it counted only 600 inhabitants. From 1807 to 1815 it was part of the Polish Duchy of Warsaw only to be taken over by Prussia again after 1815 and Congress of Vienna. The town's population in 1831 counted 1,200 people and in 1871 3,000. Its economic situation improved as it became an economic center for local villages benefited with good soil. During the Spring of Nations in 1848 Polish patriotism reinvigorated. Circle of Polish League was established and the Polish newspaper Biedaczek was distributed in the years 1849–1850 by Julian Prejs.

In 1866 Towarzystwo Rolniczo-Przemysłow was created, an association dealing with industry and agriculture. In 1879 a regional court was established in Chełmża. Two banks and school are established as well. Jews, who made up 8% of local population, built in the 1880s a synagogue. The industrial development was increased and agricultural manufacturing plant and railway terminal were completed in 1882. The population rose as well from 3,400 in 1880, 8,987 in 1900, and 10,600 in 1910. In 1869 a local church choir Cecylia was founded, which exists to this day. Around 1900, the town formed a language island of Swabian German.

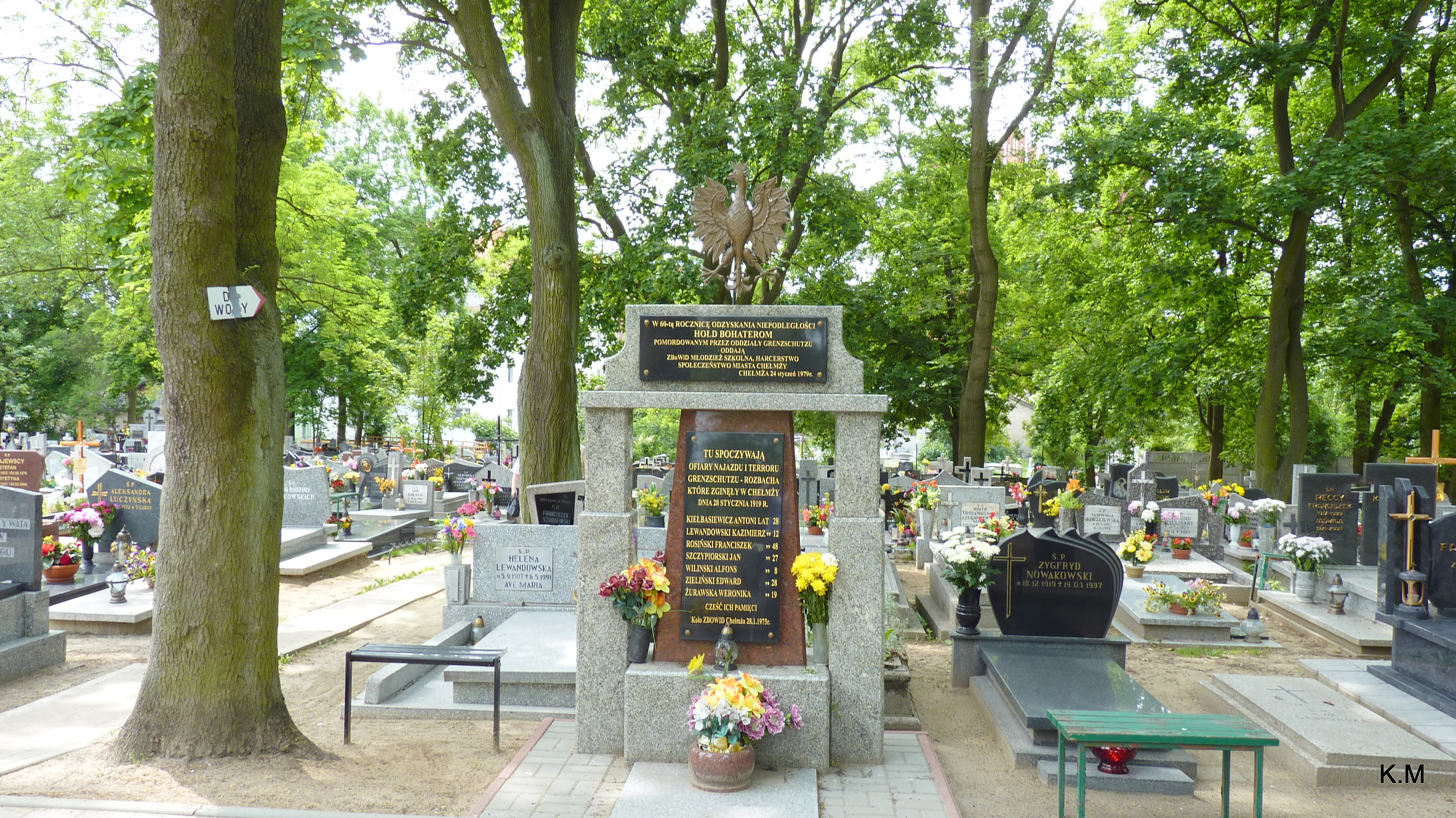
Mass grave of Polish civilians killed by the German Grenzschutz in 1919

The development of the town was stopped due to the First World War. The living conditions declined and street riots became widespread. Poles rose up against Germanisation and protests were made against the forced teaching in schools in the German language. In November 1918 Poland regained independence, and on 8 January 1919 local Poles attacked a Grenzschutz unit but were repelled. In revenge, the Germans shelled the town with artillery, and seven civilians, including two boys aged 8 and 12, were killed. Additionally, the Germans arrested several people upon suspicion of leading the protests.

On 21 January as result of Treaty of Versailles, Chełmża became part of Poland again. A part of the German population was deported (2000 people). The population now counted 98% Poles, 1.8% Germans, 0.2% Jews. The overall number of Chełmża citizens rose from 10,700 in 1921 to 13,000 in 1939. After the Great Depression in 1929 wages became lower and unemployment rose. The National Democrats followed by Centrolew, led by Stanisław Nehring, became the main parties in Chełmża. Gazeta Chełmżyńska and Głos Chełmżyński were two papers distributed in the city. The mayor of the city was Bronisław Kurzętkowski from 1921 to 1934 and Wiktor Barwicki from 1934 until 1939.

=== World War II ===
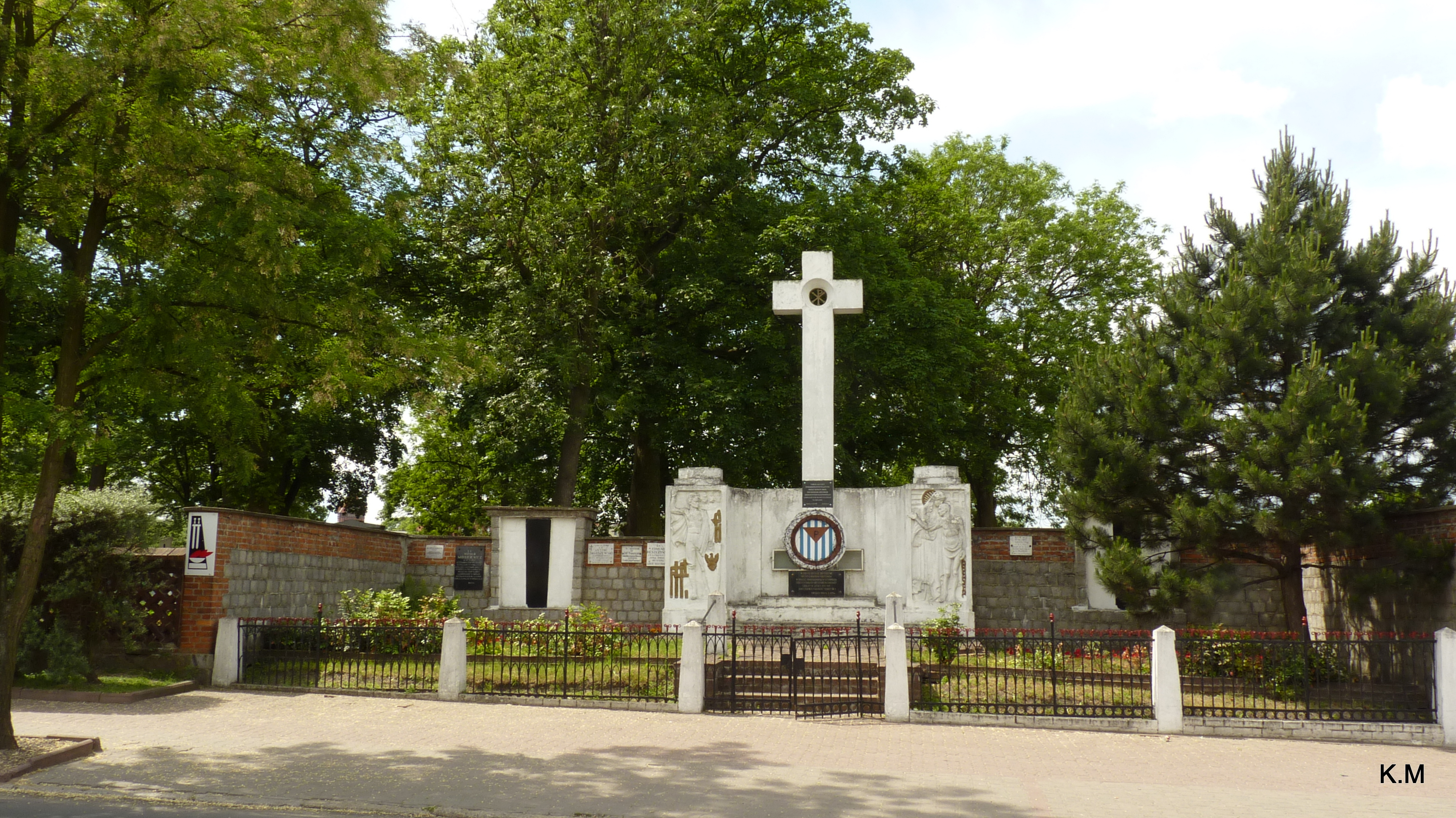
Memorial to local Poles murdered by the Germans and Russians during World War II

After the joint German-Soviet invasion of Poland, which started World War II in September 1939, the town was occupied by Germany, which carried out a genocidal campaign against the local Polish and Jewish population. Chełmża was one of the sites of executions of Poles carried out by Germany in 1939 as part of the Intelligenzaktion. Many local Poles, especially teachers, were also massacred in the Barbarka forest, also as part of the Intelligenzaktion. The German state at the time considered Poles and Jews to be untermenschen and planned their eradication as national groups. To escape this fate many local Poles took the III and IV group of Volksliste. In early 1945, in Chełmża, Polish forced labourers evacuated from Jajkowo were forcibly conscripted by the Germans to the Organisation Todt, however, some managed to escape. By the end of the war in 1945, the population of the town had declined to 10,000.

The Polish resistance was active in the town, including the Union of Armed Struggle-Home Army, and Polska Armia Powstania secret military organizations.

In January 1945 the Red Army took Chełmża, thus ending the German occupation. Soviet repressions followed and 600 people of German descent were deported to Siberia. The losses inflicted by German occupation regarding the population were gradually reversed and in 1980 Chełmża counted 15,000 inhabitants.

== Demographics ==
=== Number of inhabitants by year ===
Historical population

Year	Pop.	±%
1910	10,612	—
1921	10,698	+0.8%
1931	11,098	+3.7%
1939	12,983	+17.0%
1950	11,052	−14.9%
1960	13,629	+23.3%

Year	Pop.	±%
1995	15,292	+12.2%
2000	15,312	+0.1%
2005	15,310	−0.0%
2010	15,267	−0.3%
2015	14,854	−2.7%
2020	14,362	−3.3%

== Sports ==
The most notable sports clubs of the town are football club Legia Chełmża and rowing club Chełmżyńskie Towarzystwo Wioślarskie 1927.

== Notable residents ==
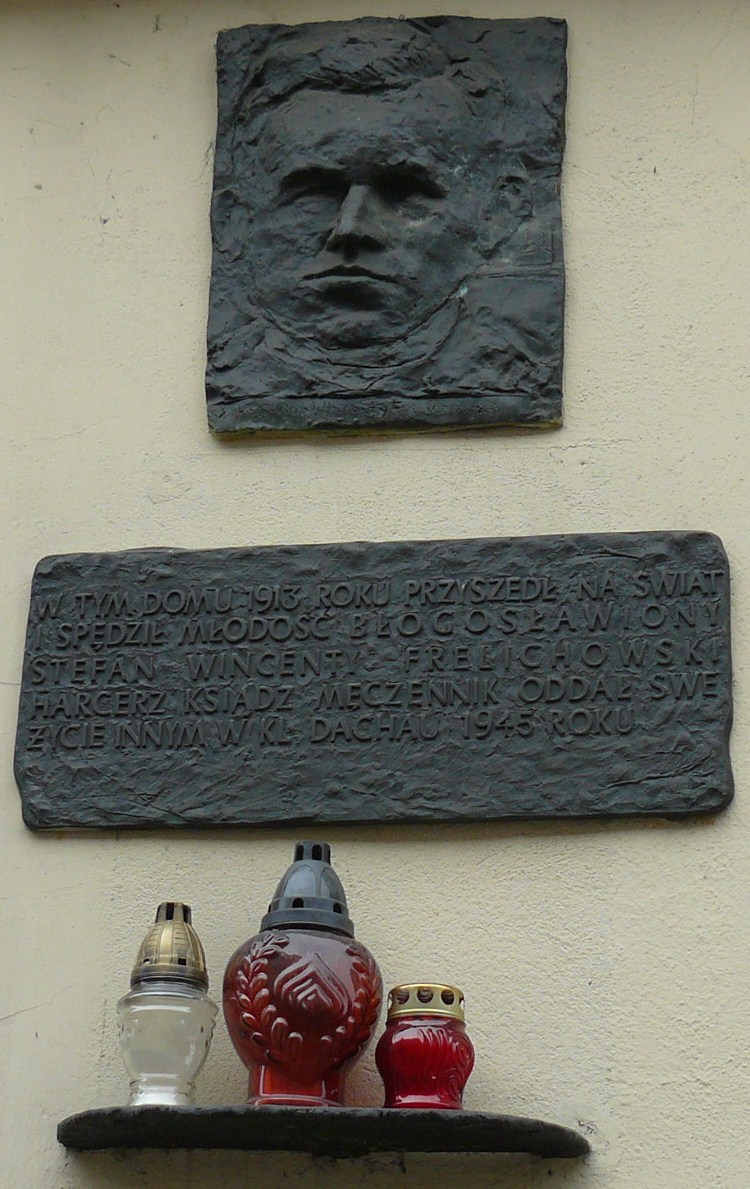
Memorial plaque at the birthplace of Stefan Wincenty Frelichowski

- Michał Czajkowski (born 1934), Polish priest and biblical scholar
- Stefan Wincenty Frelichowski (1913–1945), Polish priest and patron of Polish Scouts, died of typhus at Dachau concentration camp
- Tadeusz Glemma (1895–1958), priest, professor, historian of Polish Catholic Church
- Michał Kwiatkowski (born 1990), Polish cyclist
- Jutta of Kulmsee aka Jutta von Preussen, Saint Judith, Saint Judith of Prussia or Jutta von Sangerhausen (1200–1260)
- Andrzej Mierzejewski (born 1960), Polish road racing cyclist
- Tomasz Piotrowski (born 1968), Polish general
- Julian Prejs (1820–1904), Polish teacher and journalist
- Kurt Vespermann (1887–1957), German actor
- Eberhard Thunert (1899–1964), German general
- Józef Wrycza (1884–1961), Polish independence fighter and Catholic priest
- Bronisław Kurzętkowski (1880-1939), Mayor of Chełmża, lawyer, Polish independence fighter and activist

== Gallery ==
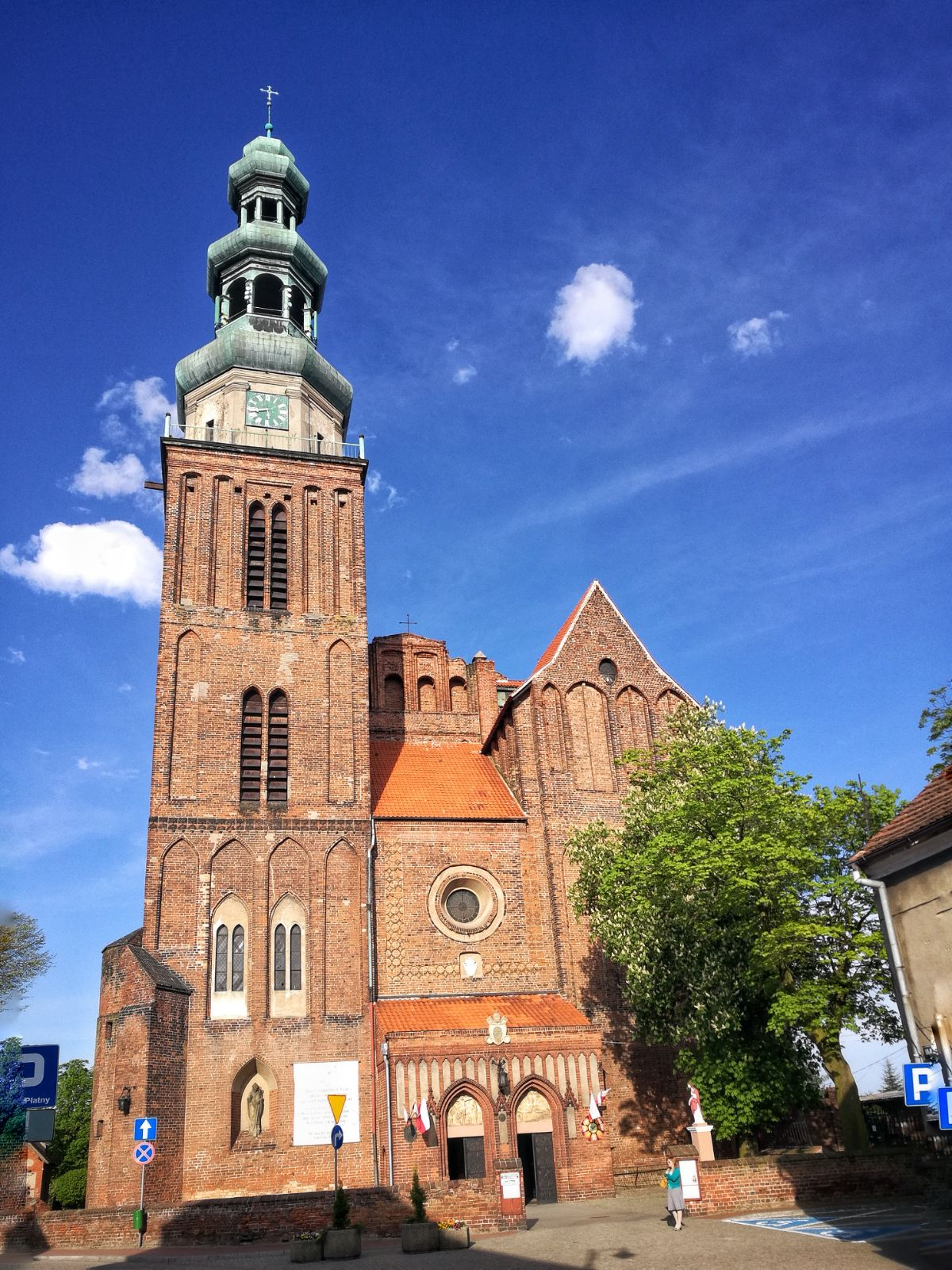
Holy Trinity Co-Cathedral in Chełmża

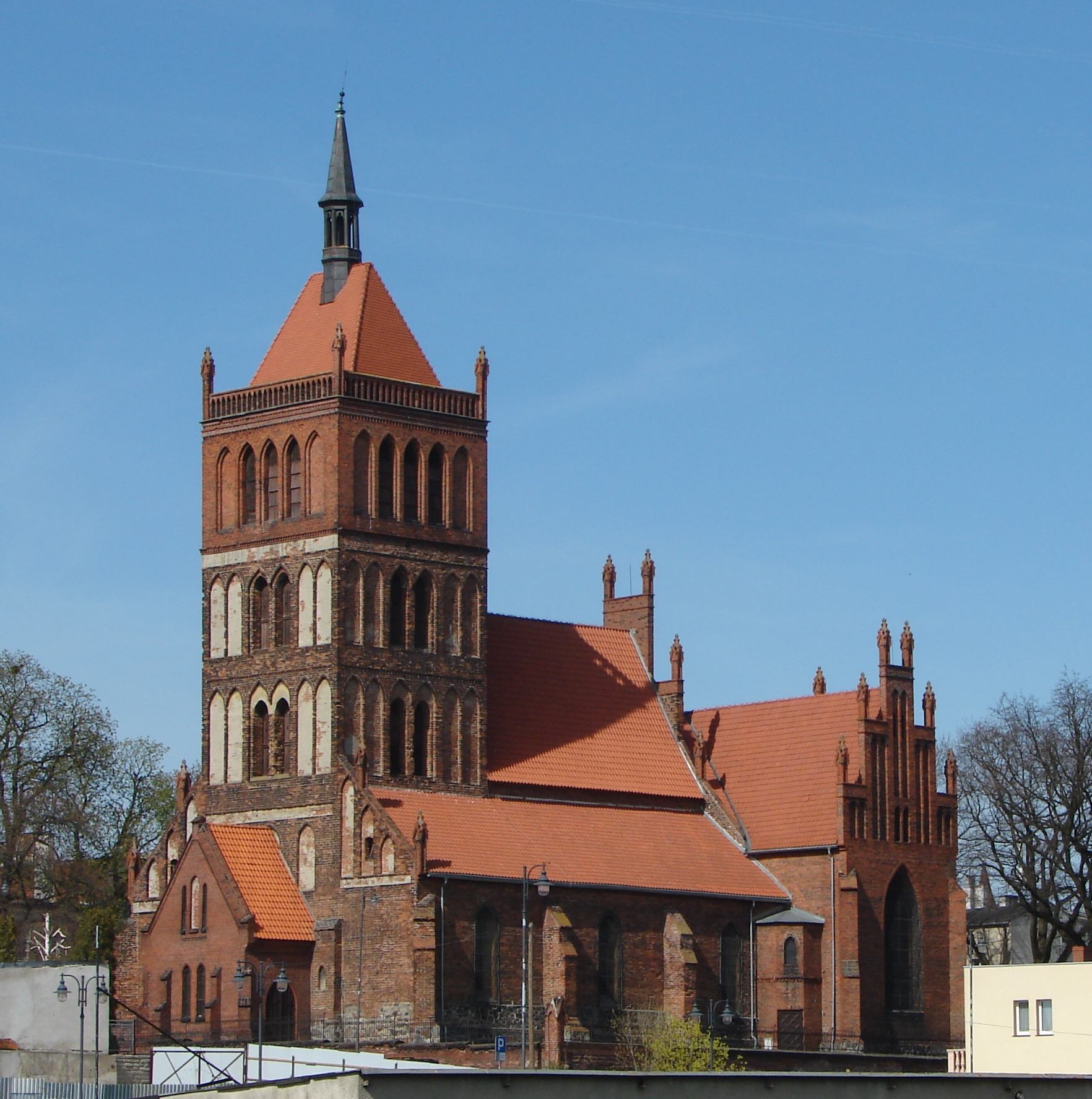
Gothic Saint Nicholas Church, built 13th–14th century

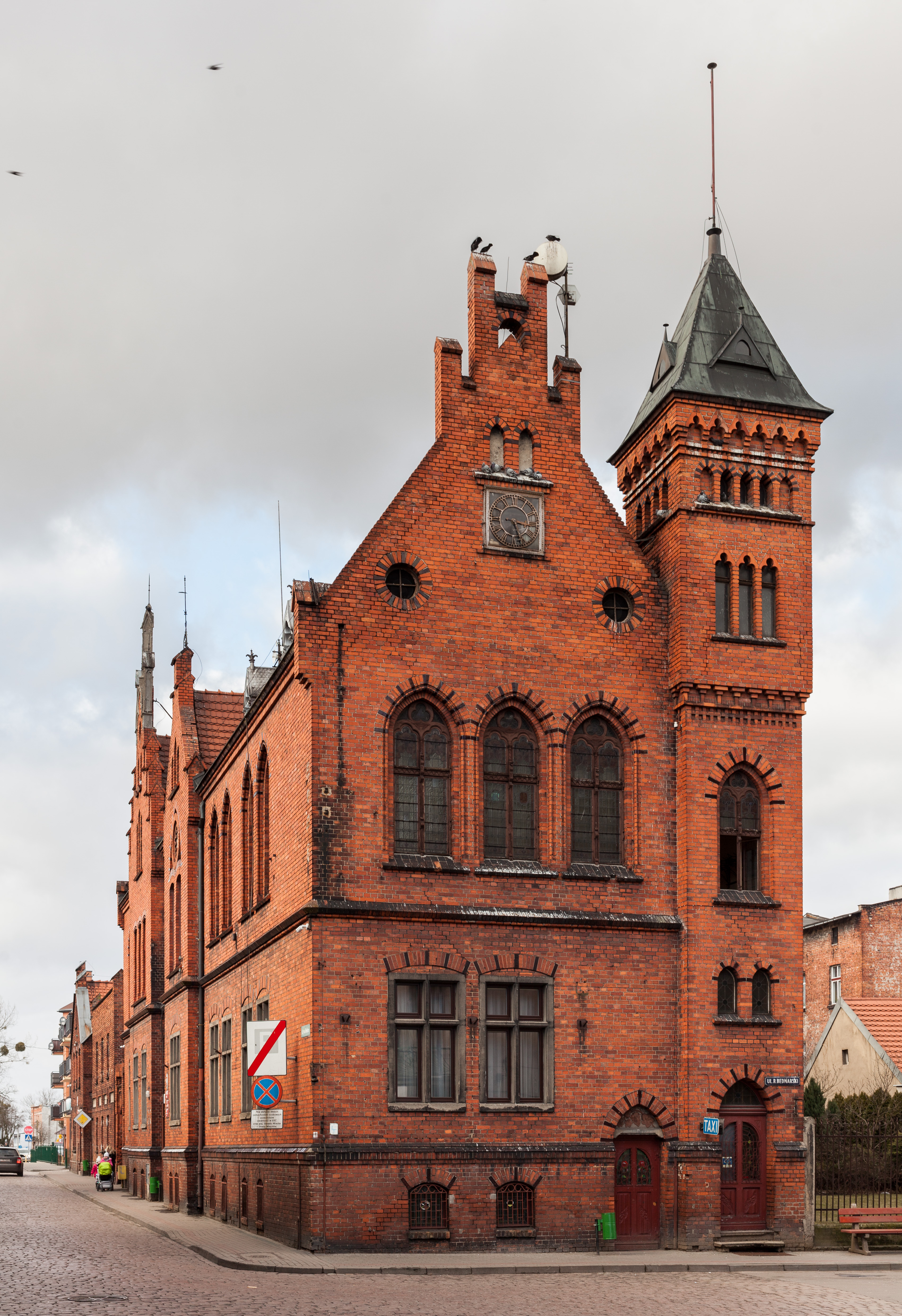
Town hall

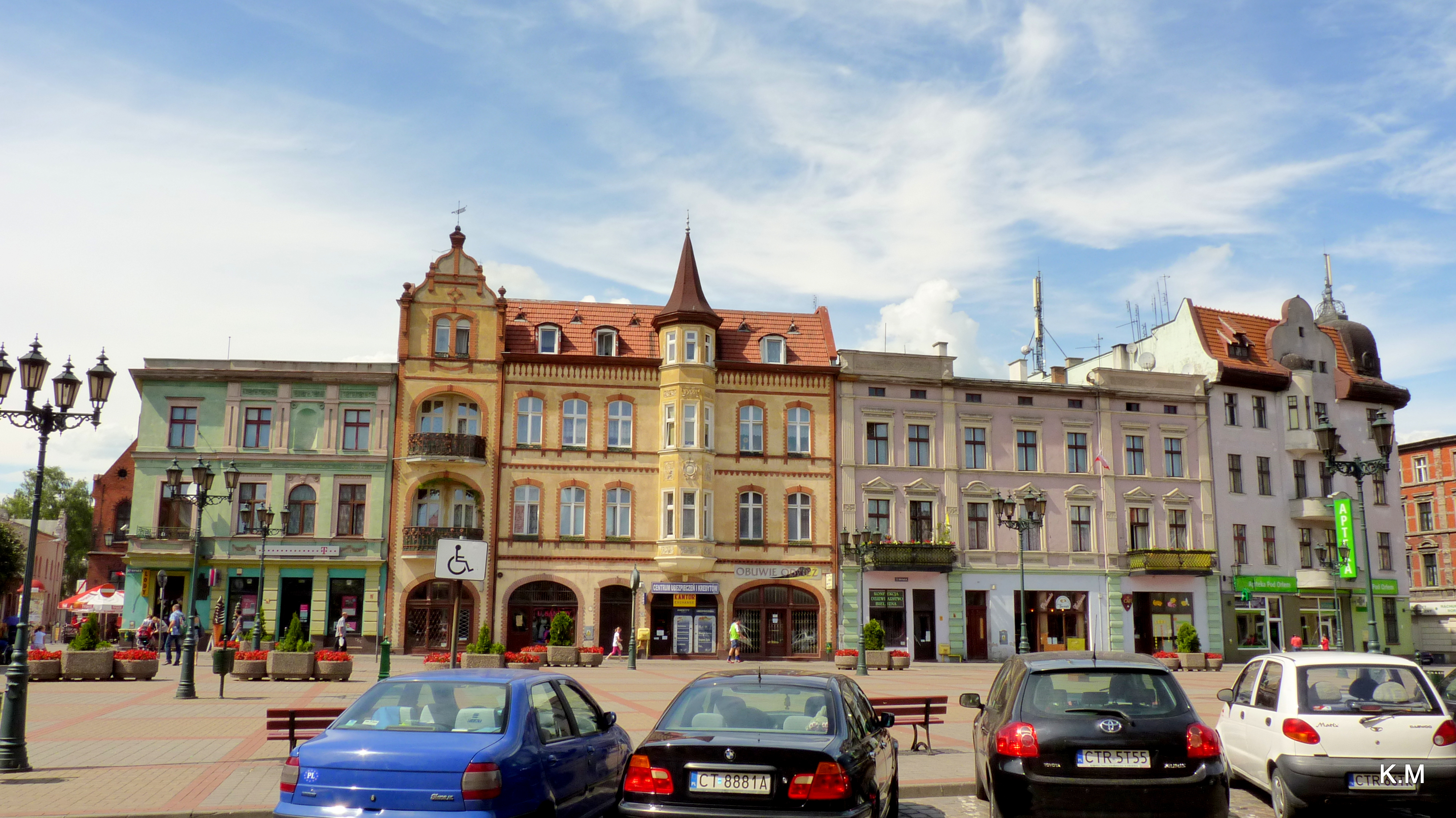
Rynek ("Market Square")

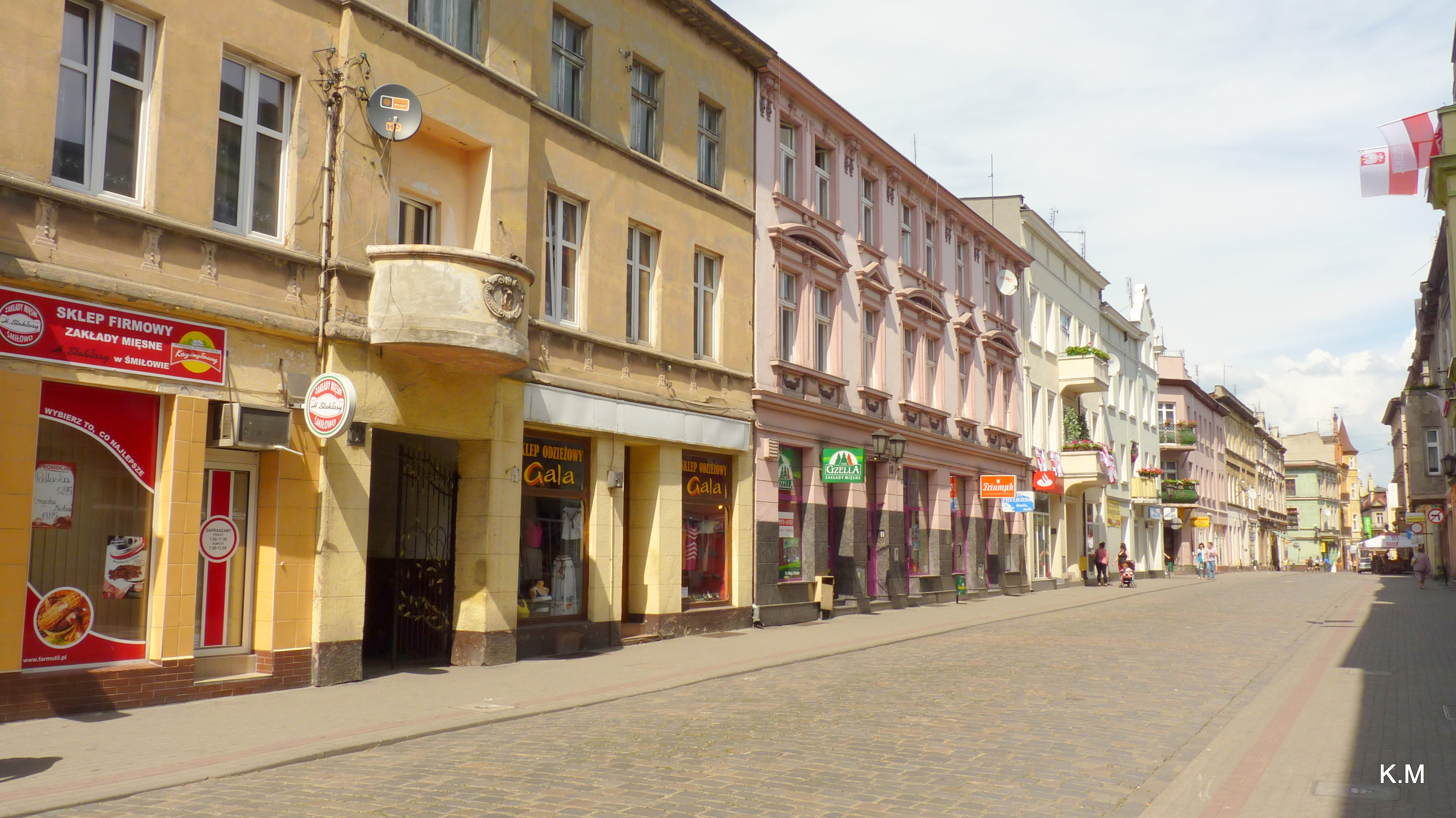
Ulica Kopernika ("Copernicus Street")

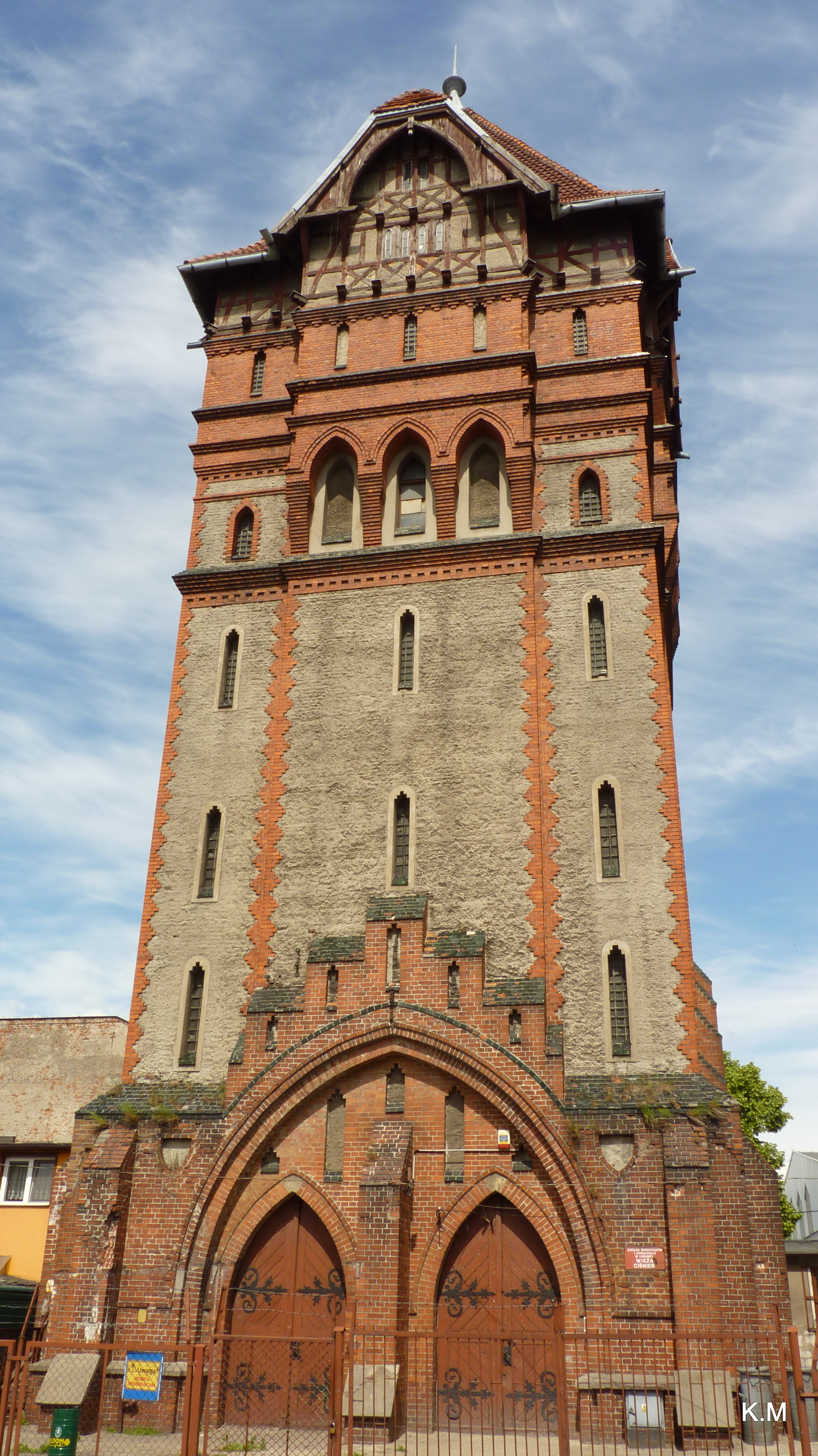
Water tower
