= Bronisław Kurzętkowski =

Polish politician, lawyer and activist

His Excellency Bronisław Kurzętkowski COM COI
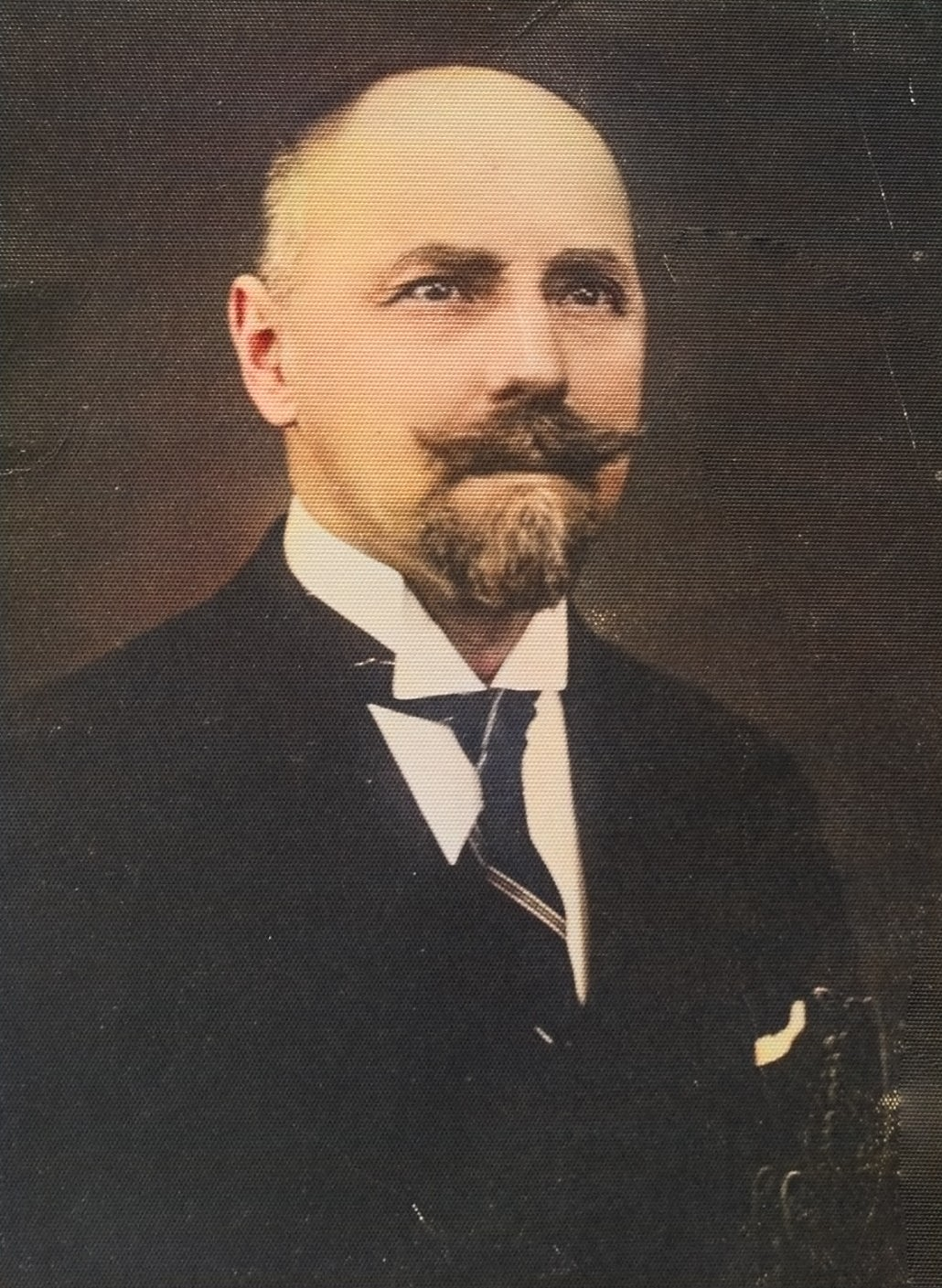
- Kurzętkowski c. 1922–27

7th Mayor of Mogilno
- In office February 22, 1938 – February 16, 1939
- Preceded by: Czesław Degler
- Succeeded by: Kazimierz Ciszewski

1st Mayor of Chełmża
- In office 14 December 1921 – 8 December 1934
- Succeeded by: Wiktor Barwicki
- Acting
- In office 21 January 1920 – 14 December 1921
- Preceded by: Office established
- Succeeded by: Himself (as Mayor of Chełmża)

Personal details
- Born: Bronisław Wenancjusz Kurzętkowski; 21 May 1880 Löbau, German Empire
- Died: 16 February 1939 (aged 58) Inowrocław, Second Polish Republic
- Resting place: Chełmża, Poland
- Party: Independent (1938–1939)
- Other political affiliations: Sanation (1929–1934); National Democracy (1920–1929)
- Spouse: Zofia Kurzętkowska
- Children: 2
- Parents: Jan Kurzętkowski Sr. (father); Maksymilianna Grzymała-Kurzętkowska (mother)
- Relatives: Kurzętkowski family
- Occupation: Politician; Lawyer; Activist

Bronisław Wenancjusz Kurzętkowski (Polish pronunciation: [brɔˈɲiswav vɛˈnant͡sjuʂ kuʐɛntˈkɔfskʲi]; 21 May 1880 – 16 February 1939) was a Polish politician, lawyer, and social activist who served as Mayor of Chełmża from 1920 to 1934 and Mayor of Mogilno from 1938 to 1939.

== Biography ==
=== Early life ===
Rogala coat of arms, used by the Kurzętkowski family

Kurzętkowski was born 21 May 1880, in Löbau to landowner Jan Kurzętkowski (1828–1903) and his wife Maksymilianna Grzymała-Puciłowska (1844–1930). Jan's first wife, Adolfine from Löbau, with whom he had five sons, died in 1865 at the age of 35. He then married Maksymilianna at the Basilica of St. Francis of Assisi, Kraków. With Maksymilianna he had seven more sons and one daughter. Maksymilianna was a well-known social activist dedicated to charity and supporting the poor. Her eight children with Jan were well-educated: Franciszek was the chief secretary of the appellate prosecutor's office in Thorn and mayor of Nowe Miasto Lubawskie; Tadeusz became a medical doctor; and Bronisław became a politician, lawyer and activist.

After graduating from primary school, six grades of pro-gymnasium in Löbau and legal studies in Berlin, Kurzętkowski moved to Chełmża in 1907. He began working at the social field at the time. While in Chełmża, he was also the president of the Supervisory Board of the Parcel Company in Löbau in 1914. He was the longtime president of the "Lutnia" Singing Society, which was active during the partition period, and belonged to the Board of the Municipal and District People's Council.

Kurzętkowski worked as a secretary and translator in the local court in Chełmża. He had previously worked in these roles at courts in Lautenburg, Briesen and Neumark. In 1919 he was ordered to move from Chełmżan into the depths of Germany, but he refused and had to resign from his position. Polish and German relations continued to break down, causing an uprising in 1919 that saw the shelling of Chełmża following the installation of Grenzschutz units in the city. With other distinguished residents, Kurzętkowski approached Lieutenant Gerhard Roßbach to negotiate. The talks ended with the members of the delegation being held hostage in the Grudziądz citadel. They were released on 20 February 1919. Kurzętkowski also gave evidence of courage and managed to prevent the execution of Józef Wrycza.

=== Career ===
Kurzętkowski standing next to War General, Józef Haller

After the Polish authorities took over Chełmża on 21 January 1920, Kurzętkowski was appointed acting mayor of the city until the following election, which took place on 5 November 1921. The inauguration was performed by Mjr. Włodzimierz Swoiński on 14 December 1921 and Kurzętkowski was officially sworn in for a 12-year term. As mayor, Kurzętkowski focused on the development of the city. He hired as many educated officials of Polish origin as possible in the Chełmża city hall and launched an intensive construction campaign. Houses were built on Polna Street; streets were paved; and a chapel of Our Lady of Częstochowa was erected in the park.

Kurzętkowski also fought against unemployment, which was particularly troublesome for the city in the interwar period. Together with Fr. Józef Szydzik, he organized various forms of support for the poor and unemployed, and was the chairman of the Parish Committee for Unemployment. He helped open a soup kitchen for the poor, located at Hallera Street next to the city slaughterhouse. He arranged for the construction of barracks for the unemployed, which still exist at Chełmińskie Przedmieście. His ally in the fight against unemployment was Stanisław Nehring, the Chełmża deputy mayor. During Kurzętkowski's term of office, the street network was expanded, electricity lines were installed and an archery range and city stadium were built. The city's financial affairs were also regulated.

As mayor, Kurzętkowski was also involved in the city's social life. He was the president of the Riflemen's Brotherhood of the Riflemen from its foundation in 1928. He was the first president of the volunteer fire department in Toruń County, and one of the founders and honorary president of the volunteer fire department in Chełmża. He was also chairman of the Friends of Scouting Circle and a non-professional judge. Shortly before Poland regained independence, Kurzętkowski resigned from his position as a Prussian official without the right to a pension and devoted himself to working for the Supreme People's Council in Poznań.

As a national democrat, Kurzętkowski came under scrutiny following the coup d'état by the Sanation movement in May 1926. In October 1927, he was accused by the government of financial irregularities in the leases of the Archidiakonka Lake, the fruit alley and market fuels, and in purchases including business trips, renovations of tenement houses, a lifeboat and a police horse. There were approximately 28 charges to the indictment against him. He was found guilty of treason and was suspended for a year. His successor was meant to be Władysław Wyszkowski, a leading representative of the Sanation movement in the city, but Wyszkowski was unable to obtain a majority in the city council and became vice-mayor instead. In the early 1930s, Kurzętkowski became involved with the Sanation movement, as well as with the Pomeranian Insurance Association in Toruń as a member of the governing council.

Kurzętkowski was reelected mayor in 1933 with 74% of the vote. His second inauguration took place on 21 January 1933 and he served until 8 December 1934, when he officially retired. Vice-mayor Wiktor Barwicki was appointed mayor in his stead. After nearly three and a half years of retirement, Kurzętkowski returned to politics. He was elected Mayor of Mogilno on 22 February 1938. During his short term, he established the Mogilno agricultural school and served as the first president of the Society of Allotment Gardens.

== Personal life and death ==
The last photo taken of Kurzętkowski shortly before his death c. February 15–16, 1939

During a meeting at a school on 15 February 1939, Kurzętkowski suddenly fainted and lost consciousness due to a heart attack. He died on 16 February 1939 in the Inowrocław District hospital at age 59. The funeral ceremony was led by the parish priest of Chełmża, Fr. Gracjan Tretkowski. Due to fear of the Germans during the occupation, no plaque was installed on his grave. During World War II, the Nazis occupied his villa at today's Sikorskiego Street 45 and took possession of the furniture and belongings. His family was relocated to a low-quality apartment. His granddaughter Maria de Bassak-Liljeberg later funded his tombstone.

Kurzętkowski and his wife Zofia Wilczyńska (d. 1951) had two daughters, Izabela Kurzętkowska de Bassak (?–1976) and Danuta Kurzętkowska (birth & death date unknown). Both are buried in the family grave in Chełmża.

== Awards ==
For his work and activity he was awarded the Cross of Merit, Honorary Badge of the Pomeranian Front,Cross of Independence and bronze and silver medals of the Association of Fire Brigades.
