= Jutta of Kulmsee =

German hermit and saint of the Roman Catholic Church

Saint Jutta of Kulmsee TOSF
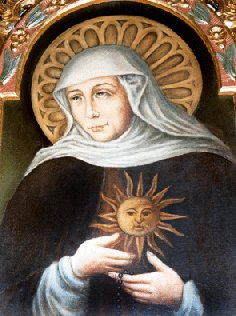
- Born: ca. 1200; Sangerhausen, Duchy of Thuringia
- Died: 12 May 1260; Kulmsee, Prussia; State of the Teutonic Order
- Venerated in: Roman Catholic Church
- Feast: 5 May
- Patronage: Prussia

Jutta of Kulmsee (also called Judith and Otta.c. 1200-May 5, 1264), was a German member of the Third Order of Saint Francis.

== Life ==
=== Birth ===
Jutta was born in Sangerhausen, Germany, southwest of Eiseleben, to the noble family of Sangerhausen, who were related to the dukes of Brunswick.

=== Marriage and children ===
At the age of fifteen, Jutta married a nobleman with whom she had children. According to The Franciscan Book of Saints, edited by Marion A. Habig, "in the married state she was more intent upon virtue and the fear of God than upon worldly honor”. Hagiographer Robert Ellsberg called their marriage "happy", although at first, Jutta's piety displeased her husband, but he eventually came to value it and they raised their children in the Christian faith. He died while on a pilgrimage to Jerusalem, and Jutta raised their children alone.

When they reached a suitable age, each child entered the religious life, which left Jutta "free to pursue her heart’s desire".

=== Religious inspiration ===
Inspired by Elizabeth of Hungary, a princess who was also from Thuringia and who had renounced her royal status and embraced poverty, Jutta joined the Third Order of Francis and, after receiving permission from her confessor, gave all her belongings away to the poor, wore simple clothes, and became a wandering pilgrim, (Note: Her confessors were the anchorite and Franciscan, Blessed John Lobedau, and later on, the Dominican and bishop of Kulmsee, Henry Heidenreich.) going barefoot in the summer and winter and caring for the poor and homeless. As the Franciscan Book of Saints put it, “she devoted herself entirely to the care of the sick, especially the lepers, and to the poor, whom she visited in their hovels and provided with all necessities. The crippled and the blind she led by the hand to her home and took care of their needs”. Although her devotion was met with derision, others were "moved by her piety and the austerity she had exchanged for her previous privilege". The Franciscan Book of Saints also states that "she recognized in the poor her Divine Lord, and deemed herself happy and highly honored that she could render them such services".

As hagiographer Alban Butler put it, she "received wonderful graces, for besides being favoured with many visions and revelations, she was given an infused understanding of the Holy Scriptures". Christ appeared to her in visions during prayer and told her, "All my treasures are yours, and yours are Mine", which encouraged her to continuing serving the poor. He appeared to her, telling her to "Follow me", and again when she was ill and close to death, giving her the choice of "entering into glory at the time, or of suffering still more out of love for Him". She chose to continue living and was able to become an anchoress.

=== Enclosure ===
In 1260, she "enclosed herself" in the forest near Kulmsee (modern-day Chełmża, a town in north-central Poland), where she was "sheltered" in a cell attached to a church by the Teutonic Order, whose Grand Master, Anno von Sangerhausen, was her relative. She devoted herself for the rest of her life to praying for the conversion of the pagans and the newly converted in Prussia. Her Christian neighbors reported witnessing her "raised high in the air in the fervor of her devotion”, like she was upheld by angels. Hagiographer Agnes Dunbar reports that Jutta miraculously walked across the pond to get to the church in Kulmsee.

=== Death ===
She lived in her cell for four years and died of a fever in 1264. She was buried at the church at Kulmsee; even though her confessor Henry Heidenreich attempted to bury her quietly as she had requested and no announcement was made, more people gathered there than ever before and 13 priests were present at her funeral. The Franciscan Book of Saints states that the church was "filled with a wonderful odor” and that a special chapel was built in her honor because of the many miracles that occurred there. The process for her canonization began 15 years after her death, in recognition of "her great renown for sanctity and the numerous miracles wrought at her tomb". Saint Mechthild of Magdeburg, the 13th-century Beguine and the first Christian mystic to write in German, had a great admiration for Jutta.

== Veneration ==
She is the patroness saint of Prussia and was a member of the Third Order of Saint Francis. She was called "the first Prussian anchoress". There are few records of Jutta's life because anchoritic life was unusual outside of southwest Germany, although her biography appears in the Acta Sanctorum.

According to scholar Michelle Sauer, Jutta's life "bore surprising resemblance" to Dorothy of Montau, another Prussian anchoress who lived later, during the 14th century. Jutta is represented in a grey habit with long sleeves, with a black strap or chord tied around her waist and neck, and is often depicted alongside Dorothea of Montau. As Sauer put it, "Jutta claimed only three things could result in a close personal relationship with God: painful sickness, exile from home, and voluntary poverty". Her feast day is May 5.

== Works cited ==
- Butler, Alban (1995). Butler's Lives of the Saints (2nd ed.). Westminster, Maryland: Liturgical Press. pp. 239–240. ISBN 0814623778. OCLC 33824974.
- Dunbar, Agnes B.C. (1901). A Dictionary of Saintly Women. Vol. 1. London: George Bell & Sons. pp. 448–449.
- Ellsberg, Robert (2017). "St. Jutta: Widow, Third Order Franciscan (c. 1200-1260)". The Franciscan Saints. Cincinnati, Ohio: Franciscan Media. pp. 34–35. ISBN 978-1632531940.
- Habig, Marion Alphonse, ed. (1979). The Franciscan Book of Saints. Chicago: Franciscan Herald Press. pp. 465–466. ISBN 0-8199-0751-0.
