= Polish House, Bydgoszcz =

20th-century building in Bydgoszcz, Poland

Polish House (Catholic House)
- Polish: Dom Katolicki w Bydgoszczy
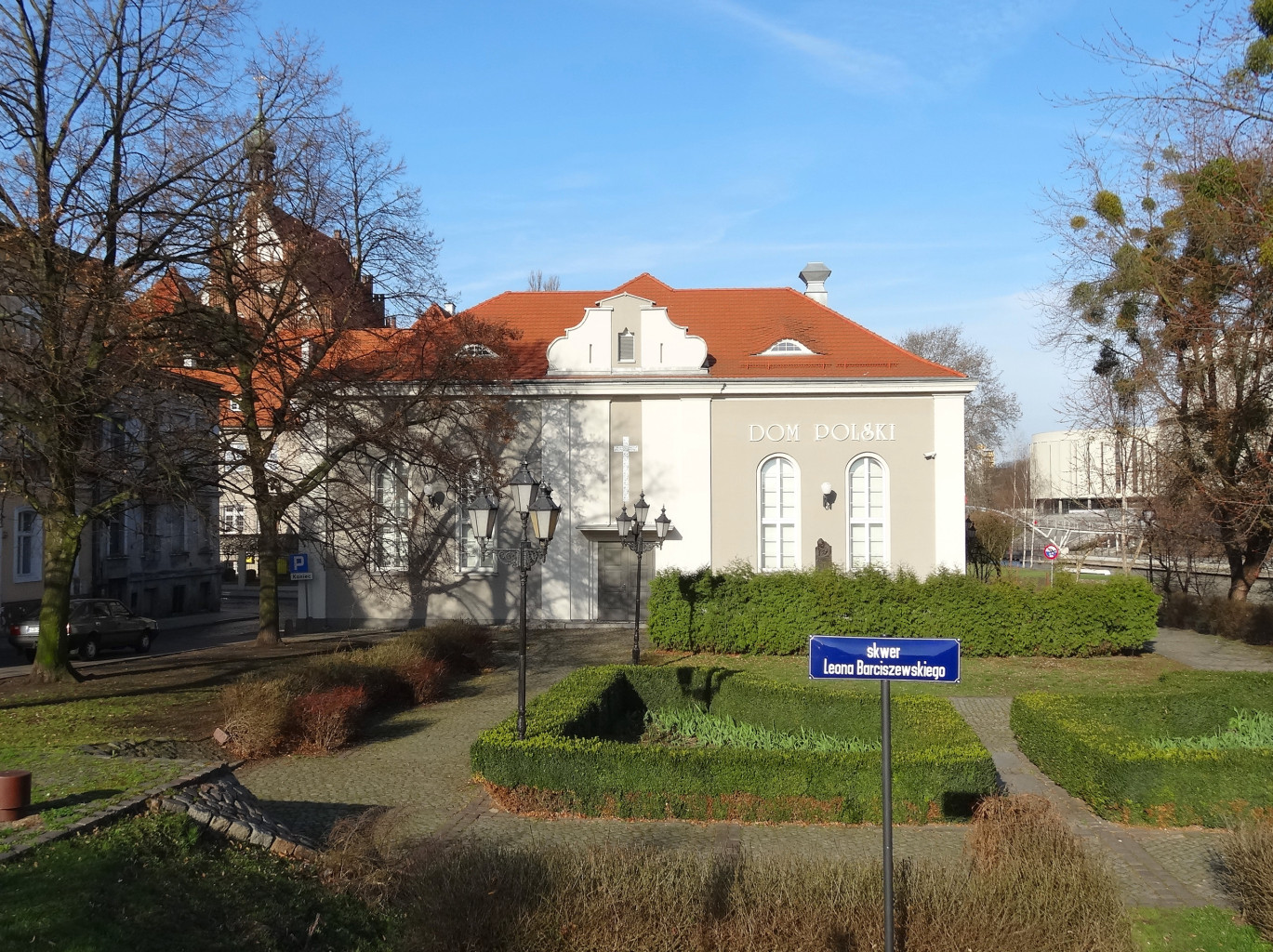
- View of the building from Mostowa Street
- Interactive map of the Polish House (Catholic House) area
- Alternative names: Catholic House in Bydgoszcz

General information
- Type: Cultural house
- Architectural style: International Style
- Classification: Reg. A/1266, 31 January 2009
- Location: 1 Grodzka Street, Bydgoszcz, Poland
- Coordinates: 53°7′33″N 18°00′00″E
- Current tenants: Diocese of Bydgoszcz
- Construction started: 1927
- Renovated: 2012
- Client: Downtown parish of Bydgoszcz
- Owner: Diocese of Bydgoszcz

Technical details
- Floor count: 2

Design and construction
- Architect: Stefan Cybichowski

The Polish House, later known as the Catholic House (Dom Polski), is an historic public building hosting activities for Catholic organizations and associations of Bydgoszcz and the curia of the Bydgoszcz Diocese. The name harks back to the Polish House that stood in Bromberg in the years 1907–1919, to the benefit of the Polish denizens in Prussian Bydgoszcz. The edifice is registered on the Heritage list of Kuyavian–Pomeranian Voivodeship, Reg. A/1266, 31 January 2009.

== Location and architecture ==
The house is located at 1 Grodzka Street, along the Brda river, in the Old Town district of Bydgoszcz. The building is situated on the 18th meridian east, adjacent to the residence of the Bishops of Bydgoszcz and the Bydgoszcz Cathedral.

The 2-storey house has a T-shaped footprint, with its main frontage looking eastwards, in the direction of the Mostowa street and its crossing over the Brda river. The main facade displays tall round top windows, crowned by eyelid dormers and a small onion-shaped wall gable.

== History ==
=== As the Polish House (1907–1919) ===
The first Polish House in then Bromberg was established in the context of the struggle of the Polish society in the city against germanisation (1870s–1910s). During this time, a number of anti-Polish laws and regulations were issued, facilitating the colonization of Polish lands. In response to this action, a social and national movement of Poles developed in Bydgoszcz, which took forms of cultural, educational and economic associations, such as:

- the Industrialists' Society (Towarzystwo Przemysłowców) founded in 1872 by Teofil Magdziński;
- the Association of Servants (Towarzystwo Czeladzi);
- the Workers' Reading Circle (Robotnicze Koło Czytelnicze) attacked by a German militia in 1878;
- the Gymnastics Society "Sokół", (Polskie Towarzystwo Gimnastyczne „Sokół”) founded in 1886;
- The Saint Wojciech Singing Society in Bydgoszcz, (Towarzystwo Śpiewu „Święty Wojciech” w Bydgoszczy) established in 1876;
- the Halka Singing Society (Towarzystwo Śpiewu „Halka” w Bydgoszczy), which initiated in 1885 the First Congress of Polish Choirs operating in Pomerania and in the Bromberg District;
- the Reading Room for Women (Czytelnia dla Kobiet), chaired later by Stefania Tuchołkowa.

These organizations initially gathered in apartments or restaurants run by Poles, but quickly lacked appropriate venues. In order to acquire premises (a Polish House), Polish denizens in Bydgoszcz established a construction company in 1906: the leader of this endeavour was doctor Emil Warmiński, who arrived in Bydgoszcz just a year earlier. In order to build up the financial capital of the company, Warmiński approached the most active activists and representatives of various professions and social classes:

- doctors (Jan Biziel, Władysław Piórek, Michał Hoppe);
- priests (Jan Filipiak, Józef Jagalski);
- merchants (Franciszek Kiedrowski, Ludwik Sosnowski, Ludwik Niedzielski).

Shares were also purchased by Polish activists from Poznań, Gniezno, Inowrocław, Toruń and other cities. Printer and bookseller Franciszek Kiedrowski was managing the fundraising for the Polish House.

In June 1907, the company purchased a property at then 5 Gamma Street from a German resident. The acquisition consisted of a main building with an auditorium and side rooms, a large garden, and a spacious courtyard. The house soon became the center of cultural and social life for Polish society in Bydgoszcz. Ludwik Sosnowski had a fountain designed by Józef Zawitaj set up in the garden and courtyard. Polish associations found their headquarters here and used it for various purposes, be it for physical training (Gymnastics Society "Sokół"), choir rehearsals (Halka Singing Society, Saint Wojciech Singing Society) or other activities. Furthermore, the edifice housed Polish language lessons, education courses and later a Polish library with a reading room. The auditorium welcomed amateur and professional performances, entertainment for Poles and their families, summer demonstrations of the "Sokół" exercises, children's activities and exhibitions.

The activities of the Polish House contributed to the revival of Polish national life in Bydgoszcz: in 1909, the first industrial exhibition of Polish crafts was organized there.

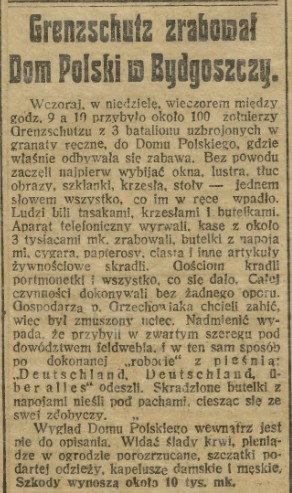
Article about the pillage of the Polish House, Dziennik Bydgoski 19 August 1919

The Polish House operated until September 1914: the outbreak of World War I had made the German authorities close all Polish social organizations. The building was then converted into a military hospital. In 1918, the Poles regained possession of the premises and resumed cultural activities there, infuriating German extremists. On 17 August 1919, approximately 100 Grenzschutz Ost paramilitary soldiers armed with hand grenades raided the property. They pillaged the house and robbed the personnel, destroying equipment and facilities. In addition, they killed and wounded dozens of people. Pictures were taken after the raid, depicting the scale of the destruction, and were later published by a bookstore as postcards, distributed throughout the country and delivered to correspondents of the Allied press.

After Poland regained independence, the Polish House was not rebuilt, since many other cultural venues for associative activities had already flourished. In 1921, a metal products factory called Fema started to operate in the buildings of the former Dom Polski, producing various types of furniture, locks, belt hinges, etc. Kazimierz and Edmund Sokolowski, firm's owners, placed a commemorative plaque in honor of the ancient Polish House on the wall of the factory at 11 Warmińskiego street. Though the board was destroyed by the Nazis, the Halka Singing Society of Bydgoszcz re-installed in 1958, at the occasion of 75th anniversary of the Polish House foundation. At the fall of communism, the factory became a car workshop and was eventually demolished in February 2019, as part of a real estate project. However, the commemorative plaque was positionned back on the plot at the end of the works.

=== As the Catholic House (1920 onwards) ===
==== Interwar years ====
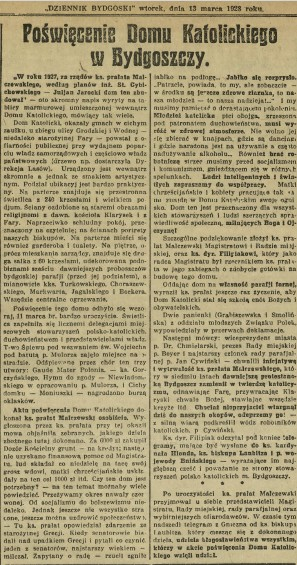
Article about the consecration of the Catholic House, Dziennik Bydgoski, 1928, nr 60

In 1920, due to the poor housing conditions in the rectory then at 11 Focha Street, Bydgoszcz parish priest Tadeusz Skarbek-Malczewski planned the construction of a large house intended for meetings and educational activities for Catholics. The plot, belonging to the church, was located at 1 Grodzka Street. Stefan Cybichowski was chosen as the designer of the project: the architect from Poznań had already realized many sacred buildings in Bydgoszcz, in Greater Poland and in Pomerania. The construction was financed from social contributions and funds of the city hall, chaired by Bernard Śliwiński.

Construction works were carried out between 1927 and 1928 by a local company owned by Julian Jarocki. The consecration of the Catholic House was performed by Father Tadeusz Skarbek-Malczewski on 11 March 1927. According to Cybichowski's plans, the house sheltered on the ground floor a reading room and a common room with 240 seats, decorated with paintings from the Poor Clares Church and the Bydgoszcz Cathedral. The first floor had a hall with 60 seats and the administrator's apartment. The building hosted gatherings of church associations and brotherhoods of the parish church, meetings with children and youth, religious plays staged by amateur groups, as well as rehearsals of the Saint Wojciech Singing Society and many other various religious events.

==== During WW2 ====
In December 1939, the collections of the Municipal Museum were moved to the House, anticipating the demolition by Nazi authorities of the museum building sitting on the western side of the Old Market Square, Bydgoszcz. The artifact's curator was Kazimierz Borucki. At the beginning of 1940, German authorities began to raze the Old Market Jesuit church, the entire western frontage of the Square -including the tenement house hosting the regional Museum (at Nr. 2), and edifices at Mostowa street cornering the Brda river. Following these operations, the Catholic House had his front facade open to the bridge on the Brda river, as one can still see today. The years of conflict impacted the House: traces of fire from WWII were still visible when the reconstruction started in the 2010s.

==== After 1945 ====
After World War II, the House was soon repaired and opened again for meetings of Catholic associations and for the activities of the pastoral ministry of the deaf and the academic ministry. In 1950, a semi-public chapel was established here, and in 1961 it became a public one dedicated to St. Adalbert.

From that time on, the building served as a place of worship bringing together young people, intelligentsia and the pastoral care of the deaf. On 25 August 1964, Primate Cardinal Stefan Wyszyński established in the St. Adalbert chapel the city's first center for Academic pastoral care. Many activities were held at the House: regular Sunday masses, conservatories for students, integration meetings and special occasions services. The students and academic staff living there were placed under surveillance by the PRL Security Service. On 14 December 1971, the seat of academic ministry was moved to the nearby Poor Clares' Church and the services for children and deaf people transferred to the Catholic House.

In 1989, a monument to Leon Barciszewski, a Mayor of Bydgoszcz killed in 1939 by Nazis, was unveiled in the square in front of the House. It was moved in 2007 to the Wool Market Square. From 1982 to 2000, the building housed lectures organised by the Primate's Institute of Christian Culture (Prymasowski Instytut Kultury Chrześcijańskiej). In 2001, it was decided to close the edifice, because of its poor technical condition.

After the establishment of Bydgoszcz's Diocese in 2004, the local curia took over the administration of the House and planned its refurbishment. Some renovation works began in 2007, partly by means of grants from the Bydgoszcz City Hall. Thanks to an EU grant under the Regional Operational Program for the Kuyavian–Pomeranian Voivodeship, the building was thoroughly overhauled and transformed into the Institute of Culture – Polish House (Instytut Kultury – Dom Polski), dedicated to cultural and social activities. Furthermore, the edifice houses the diocesan conference center and is scheduled to welcome the future Museum of the Bydgoszcz Diocese.

The official opening ceremony of the Institute of Culture – Polish House took place on 24 May 2012, in the presence of Jan Tyrawa, then Bishop of Bydgoszcz, and Rafał Bruski, the President of Bydgoszcz.

== Gallery ==
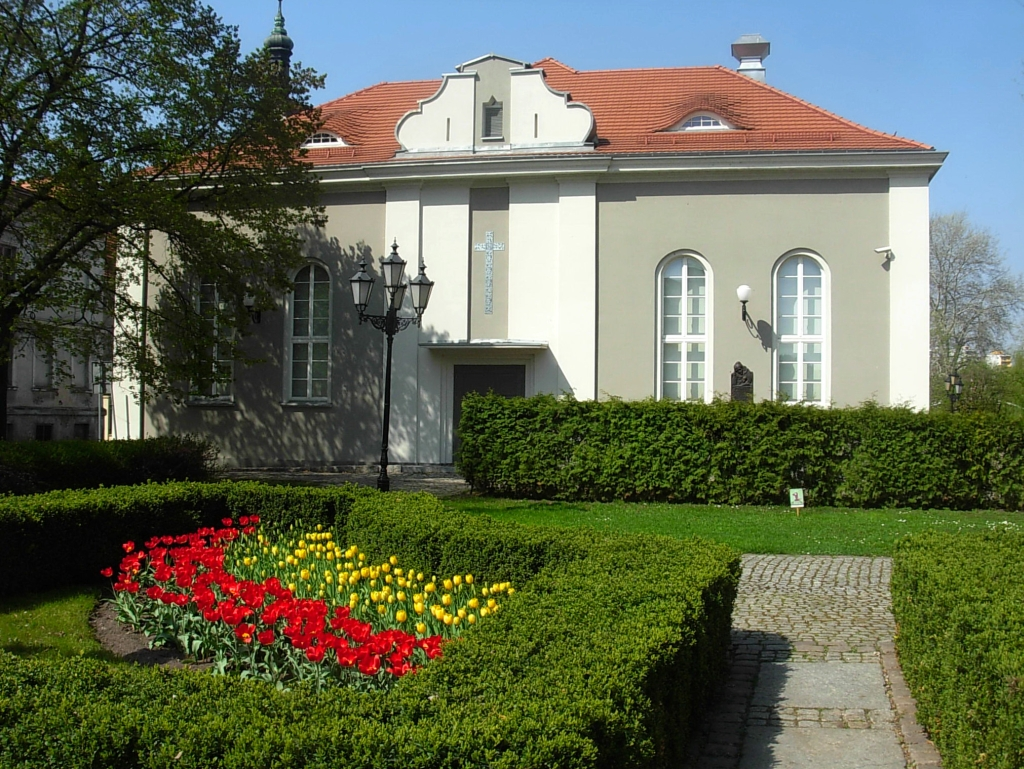
Main facade

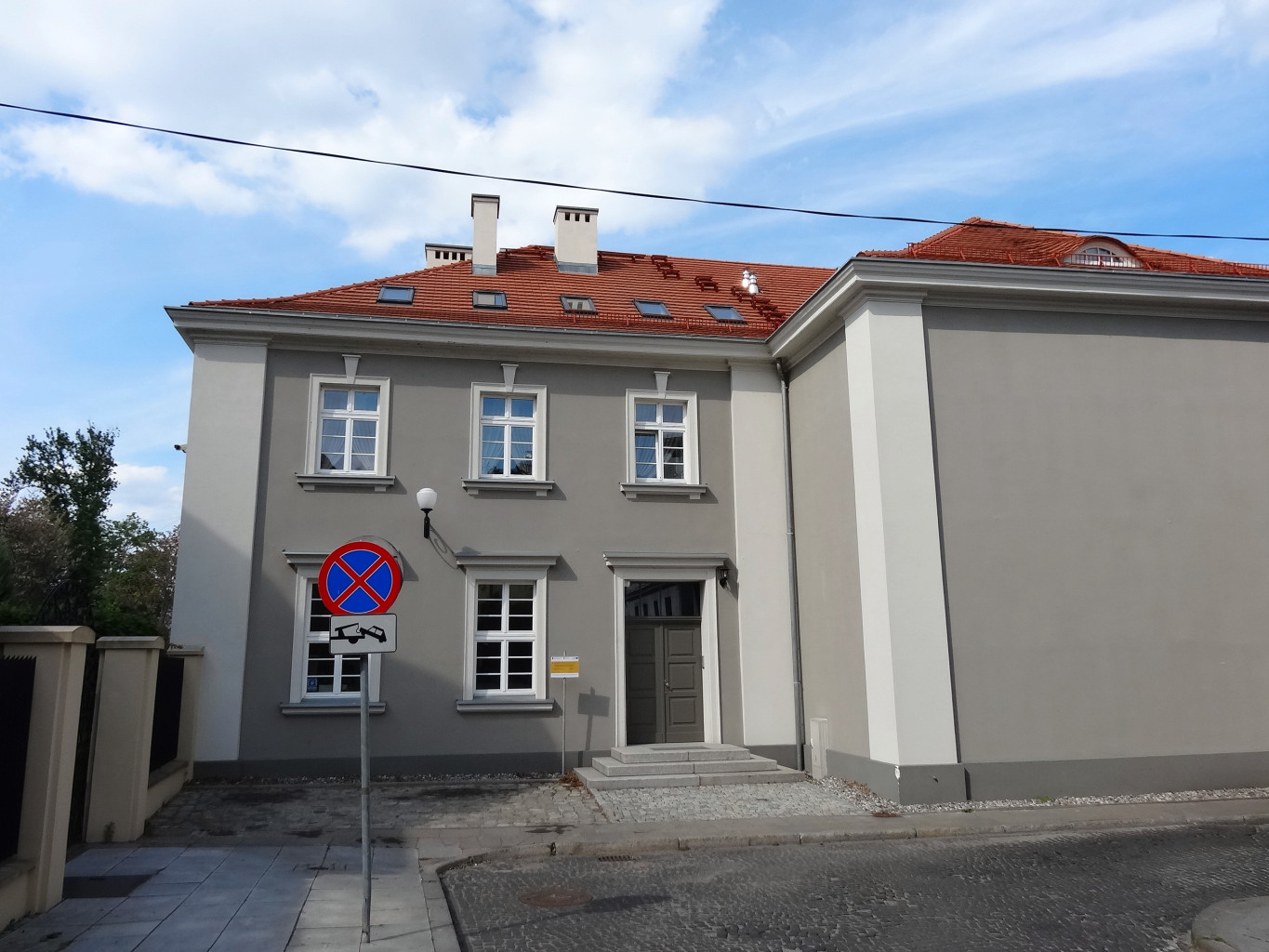
Rear wing

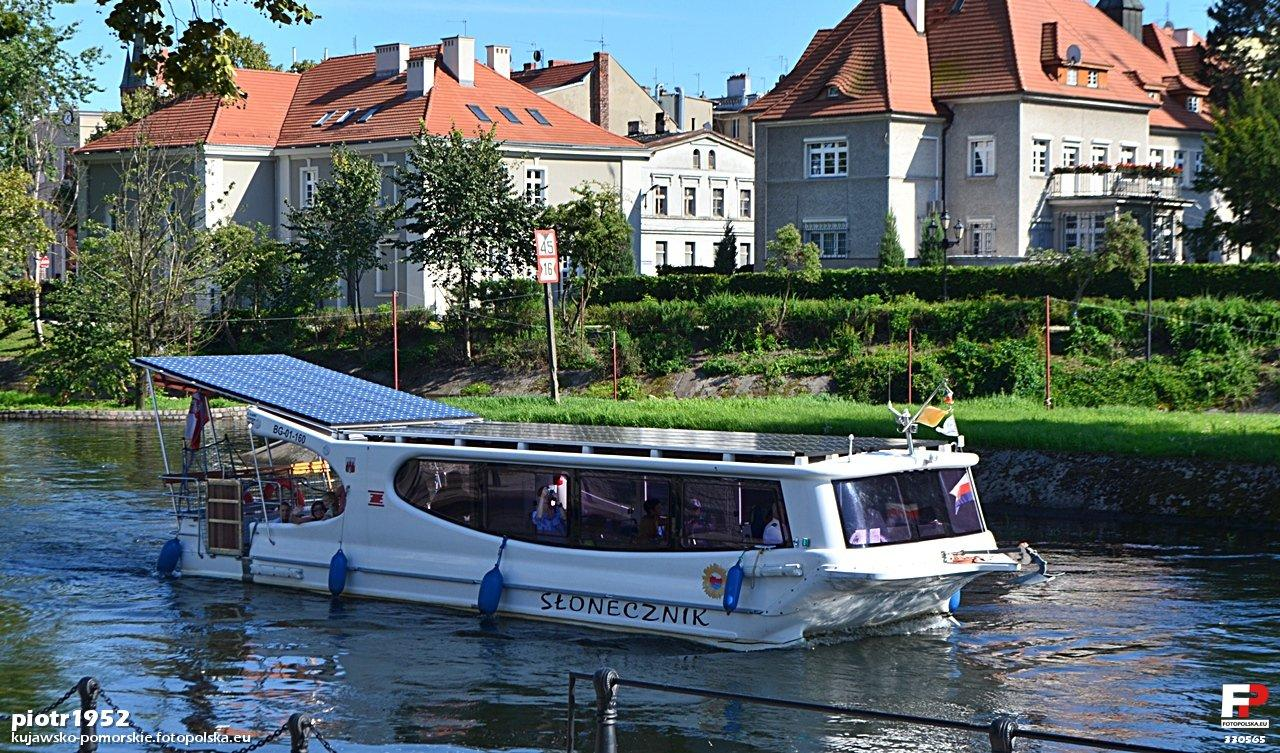
Polish House (left) and Diocese seat (right)

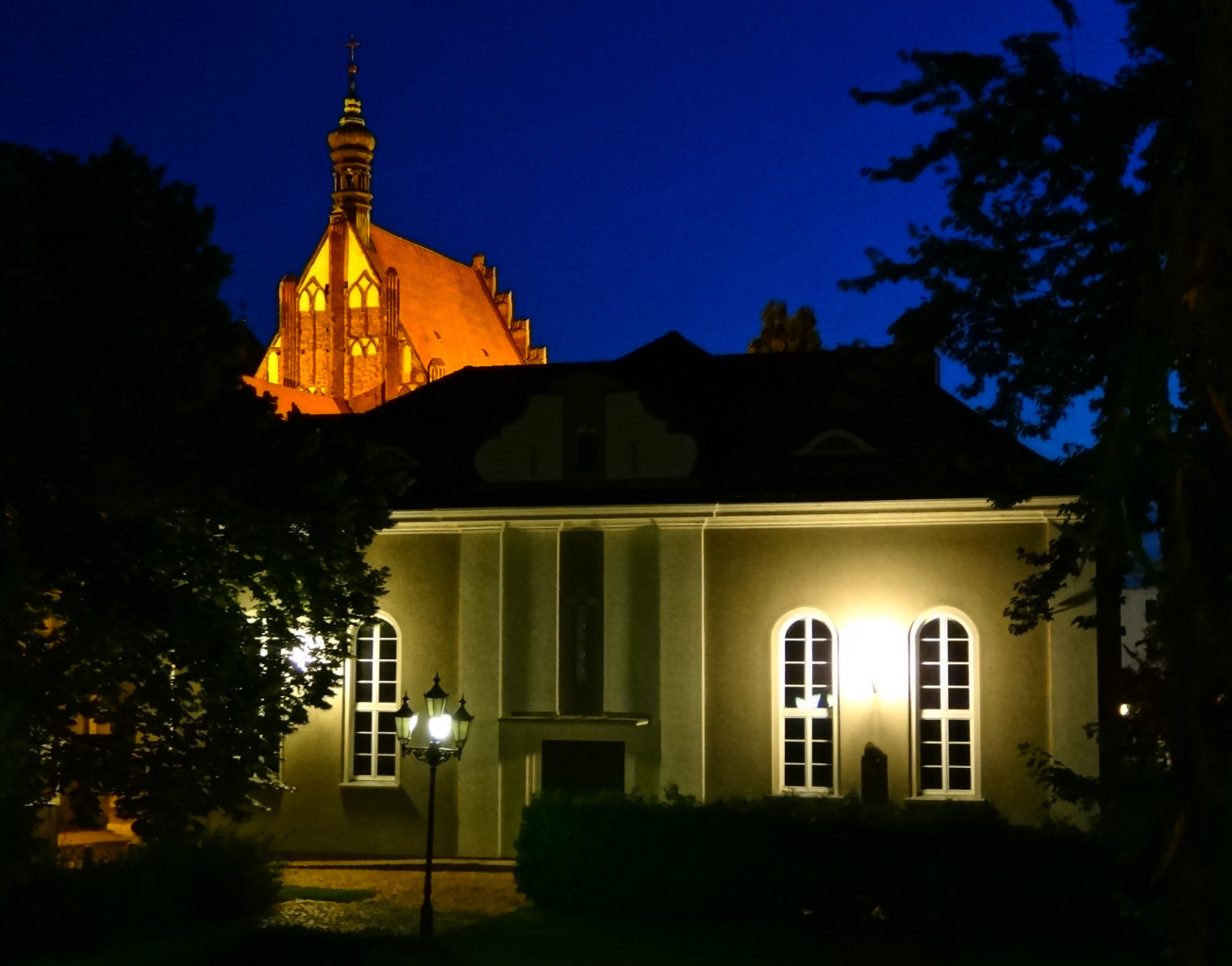
By night, with the Bydgoszcz cathedral in the backdrop

== See also ==
- Bydgoszcz
- Diocese of Bydgoszcz
- Grodzka Street, Bydgoszcz
- Emil Warmiński
- Teofil Magdziński
- Stefania Tuchołkowa
