= Stefania Tuchołkowa =

Polish writer and national activist. (1874-1924)

- Stefania Tuchołkowa z domu Zaleska
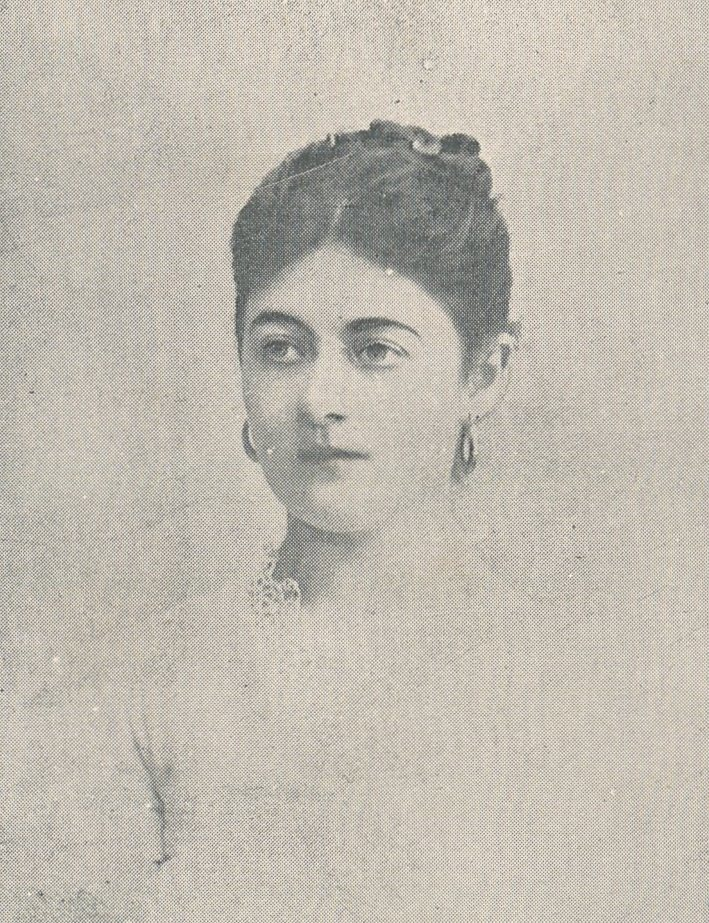
- Stefania Tucholkowa
- Born: 25 April 1874; Bożejewiczki, German Empire
- Died: 4 March 1924 (aged 49); Bydgoszcz, Poland
- Resting place: Nowofarny cemetery Bydgoszcz
- Occupations: Writer, publicist, national activist

Stefania Tuchołkowa née Zaleska (1874-1924) was a Polish journalist, writer and national activist.

== Biography ==
=== Childhood ===
Stefania Zaleska was born on 25 April 1874 in Bożejewiczki, Żnin County, 48 kilometres (30 mi) southwest of then Bromberg. Her parents were Romuald Zaleski, a landowner and Rozalia née Sulerzyńska.

The couple had only daughters in addition to Stefania: Maria (died in infancy), Józefa and Władysława.

She was first educated at home and then went at the age of 12 at Anna and Anastazja Danysz's boarding school for girls in Poznań.

=== Activities in Bydgoszcz ===
On 13 November 1891, she married Artur Tuchołka, a landowner. After losing their estate, the Tuchołkas moved to Bromberg around 1900. Artur became a merchant: they eventually settled at today's 73 Dworcowa street. The couple had nine children, two of whom died in childhood.

Once in the city, Stefania devoted all her free time to literary and educational work as well as reading campaigns among Polish residents or charity work.

After Halina Warmińska, wife of Dr. Emil Warmiński, she took in 1917 the seat of chairwoman of the Reading Room for Women (Polish: Towarzystwo Czytelni dla Kobiet). She also participated in the Polish Women's Circle in Bydgoszcz (Polish: Koła Kobiet Polskich w Bydgoszczy). From 1912 onwards, Tuchołkowa started publishing her works in a column of the daily newspaper Dziennik Bydgoski, established in 1905 by Jan and Wincentyna Teska.

During World War I she helped Wincentyna Teskowa in editing and publishing the Dziennik Bydgoski and in 1919 she temporarily served as its editor-in-chief.

She regularly lobbied for the return of the city of Bydgoszcz to the Polish territory. During the Greater Poland Uprising, together with other women, she operated in a clandestine cell at the Polish People's Council for the city of Bydgoszcz, recruiting volunteers for the uprising and organizing their smuggling to the fighting areas. Furthermore, Tuchołkowa became the godmother of the flag of the 62nd Infantry Regiment billeted in Bydgoszcz (today's Warszawska Street).

After the re-creation of Poland, Stefania turned to political activities. In 1920, she took the lead of the Women's Circle of the Christian Democratic party. Under this banner, she was elected in 1921 to the Bydgoszcz City Council. However, she had to resign before the end of her term, on 4 February 1924, due to permanent and incurable heart and kidney conditions.

She died on 4 March 1924, in Bydgoszcz. She was buried at the Bydgoszcz Nowofarny cemetery. Her funerals gathered crowds of Bydgoszcz residents, including the mayor of Bydgoszcz, Bernard Śliwiński.

=== Literature activity ===
She devoted herself with passion to literature. She penned popular social and historical novels (The Devil of game, Goraj, The Maid of Orleans) and plays

She translated novels from French into Polish.

National, patriotic and Catholic values pervaded her journalistic works (articles, short stories, feuilletons, lyrics). They were published in Dziennik Bydgoski and Przewodnik Katolicki (Catholic Guide).

On 8 December 1922, Stefania represented the Bydgoszcz literary community at the congress of the Polish Writers' Trade Union in Poznań.

== Works ==
=== Journalistic works ===
- Articles;
- Short stories;
- Feuilletons;
- Songs.

=== Novels ===
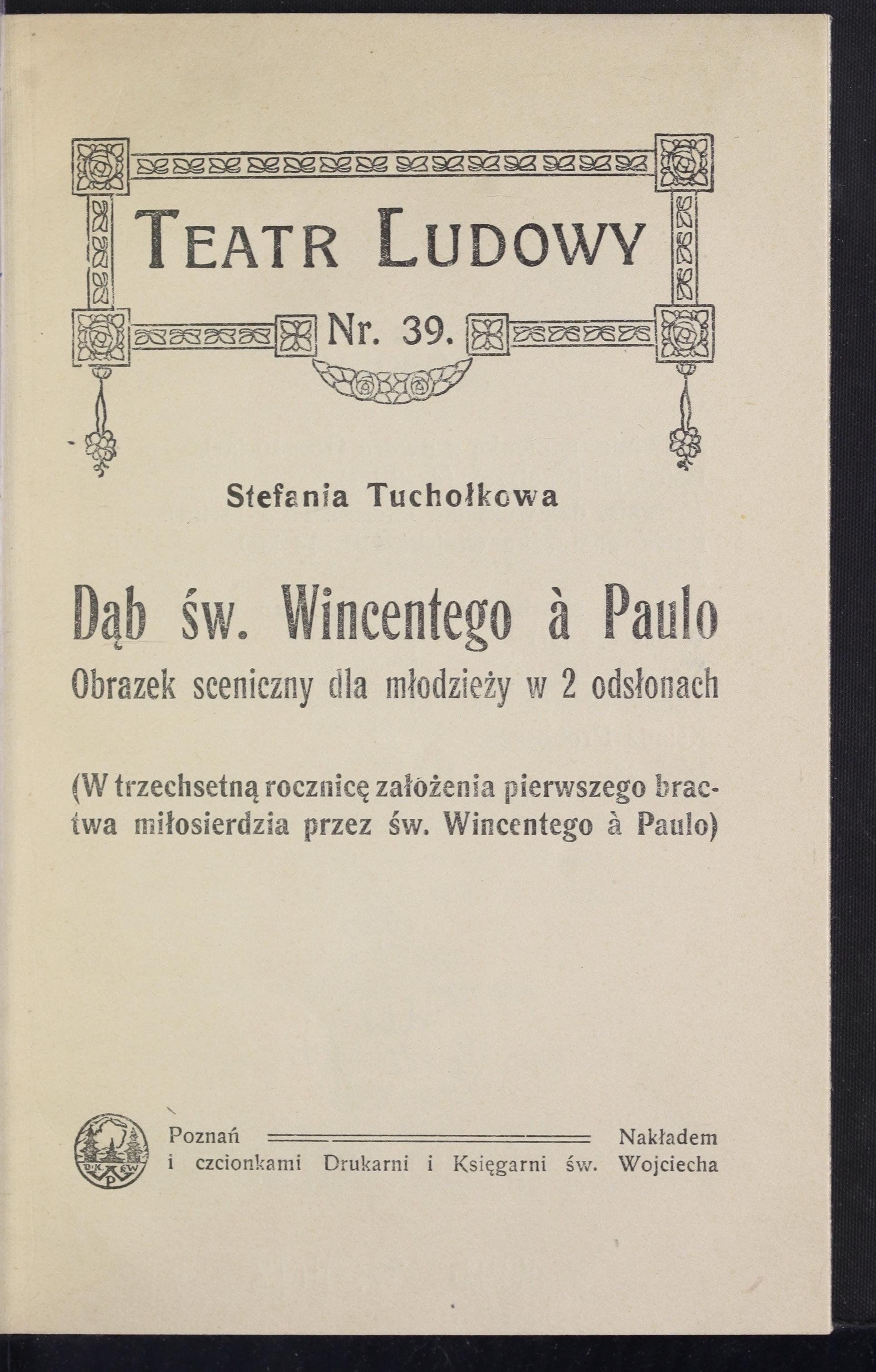
Cover of the Dąb św. Wincentego à Paulo

- Marcin's farmstead: (a picture from life) - Marcinowa zagroda : (obrazek z życia) (1908);
- The Devil of game- Polish: Demon gry (1909);
- Goraj - A story set against the backdrop of the times of Mieczysław I and Bolesław Chrobry written on the 950th anniversary of the introduction of Christianity to Poland (1916);
- The Maid of Orleans - Dziewica Orleanska (1923);
- On the Wings of Icarus: A National Novel Against the Background of the Uprising of 1863 - Na skrzydłach Ikara : powieść narodowa na tle powstania roku 1863 (1933).

=== Plays ===
- The Oak of St. Vincent de Paul: a scenic picture for young people in 2 versions - Dąb św. Wincentego à Paulo : obrazek sceniczny dla młodzieży w 2 odsłonach (1917);
- When the Brave Trumpets Sound - Gdy zabrzmią trąby Chrobrego : epizody sceniczne w 3 aktach ze śpiewami narodowemi na tle wojny i zmartwychwstania Polski (1919);
- Uncle Fonsio: an operetta farce in 2 acts for singing groups and amateurs - Stryjek Fonsio : farsa operetkowa w 2 aktach dla drużyn śpiewaczych i amatorów (1922);
- Ludwik Narbutt, dramatic poem in 3 acts - Ludwik Narbutt, poemat dramatyczny w 3 aktach (1923).

=== Translations ===
- Bez Rodziny - Sans Famille by Hector Malot. In recognition of her work, the French Academy awarded her an award.

== Commemorations ==
In 1990, a street in the district of Fordon has been named after her.

For the Women's Day 2020, Stefania Tuchołkowa was distinguished as one of the 25 most prominent women from Bydgoszcz.

== See also ==
- Bydgoszcz
- Jan Teska
- Bernard Śliwiński

== Bibliography ==
- (in Polish) Błażejewski, Stanisław; Kutta, Janusz; Romaniuk, Marek (1995). Bydgoski Słownik Biograficzny. Tom II [Bydgoszcz biography dictionary. Tome 2] (in Polish). Gdańsk: Kujawsko Pomorskie Towarzystwo Kulturalne Gdańsk. p. 145. ISBN 9788385327271.
- (in Polish) Nadolska, Anna (1995). Ziemianka w służbie B ydgoszczy. Kulturalna, społeczna i narodowa działalność Stefanii Tuchołkowej na początku XX wieku. Kronika Bydgoska 39 [A landowner in the service of Bydgoszcz. Cultural, social and national activity of Stefania Tuchołkowa at the beginning of the 20th century. Bydgoszcz Chronicles 39] (in Polish). Bydgoszcz: Towarzystwo Miłosnikow Miasta Bydgoszczy - Bydgoskie Towarzystwo Naukowe. pp. 85–102.
