= Kazimierz Borucki =

Polish painter, art conservator and curator, 20th century

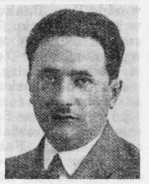
- Kazimierz Borucki
- Born: July 11, 1898; Inowrocław, German Empire
- Died: February 11, 1986 (aged 87); Bydgoszcz, Poland
- Resting place: Nowofarny Cemetery in Bydgoszcz
- Awards

Kazimierz Borucki (1898–1986) was a Polish painter, art conservator, curator, head of the Municipal Museum (1926–1939) and director of the Leon Wyczółkowski Regional Museum (1946–1965) in Bydgoszcz.

== Life ==
=== Youth ===
Kazimierz Borucki was born on 11 July 1898, in Inowrocław. He was one of six children of Wojciech and Anna, née Wrzesińska.

In 1906, along with his older sister, Władysława, he participated in the 1906 school strike. After graduating from elementary school, he received private lessons from a priest, Father Antoni Laubitz.

Kazimierz began his professional training at the age of 13, in the studio of art conservator Jan Rutkowski, initially in Inowrocław and later at the Kaiser-Friedrich-Museum in Poznań (today's National Museum). Between 1916 and 1918, he was a troop leader in the 1st Prince Józef Poniatowski Scout Troop in Inowrocław. In 1918, he moved with his professor to the Warsaw's State Conservation Workshop housed in the Royal Castle.

In May 1918, he was drafted into the Imperial German Army and was transferred the Western Front. At the end of the conflict, Borucki returned to Inowrocław in November 1918: there, he became a member of the local People's Guard and as such participated in the Greater Poland Uprising. He took part in the defense of Inowrocław and in the fighting in Chmielniki near Bydgoszcz, where he was captured. Kazimierz stayed for three months in a POW camp in Altdamm near Szczecin (January to March 1919).

=== Interwar period ===
Once released in April 1919, Kazimierz joined the Kujawianka artillery battery stationed in Inowrocław, from where he was assigned to a Signal platoon of the 5th Greater Poland Rifle Regiment. He served in the Polish Army until June 1921. Borucki was demobilized on 21 August 1921: he decided to move to Bydgoszcz to be employed in the city administration. He worked in different departments in succession: the Municipal Statistical Office, the Municipal Theatre, the Industrial Office and the Property Transfer Office.

He eventually found a job as a painter and decorator in the painting studio of the Municipal Theatre. In August 1923, Father Jan Klein, the director of the District Museum in Bydgoszcz, hired him as an art conservator and administrative employee. Over the years, Kazimierz Borucki rose up within the museum structure:

- museum secretary (1925);
- deputy curator (1934);
- museum curator (1938).

In 1939, he passed the Matura exam as an external student, following a course organized by the Bydgoszcz Chapter of the Society of Higher Education Teachers (Kolo Towarzystwa Nauczycieli Szkół Wyższych w Bydgoszczy).

Borucki took the succession of Tadeusz Dobrowolski when the latter left his position as museum director in 1926. In 1928, he managed to organize an exhibition about Bydgoszcz painter Walter Leistikow. A close friend of Leon Wyczółkowski who lived in nearby Gościeradz, Gorucki presented several of his works and displayed in 1933 a memorabilia exhibit from the history of Bydgoszcz. In 1937, Kazimierz supervised the transport of 400 works by Wyczółkowski, donated to thr city of Bydgoszcz by Franciszka Wyczółkowska, the painter's widow. In addition, the museum's inventory was enriched by a collection of sculptures donated by Konstanty Laszczka. All these valuable acquisitions were presented during a special show organized in the premises of the Borderland Internat on Chodkiewicza Street.

During the 1930s, Kazimierz Borucki continually enriched the museum's acquisition with works by outstanding artists from various domains (e.g. painting, graphic art, sculpture). He created a gallery dedicated to local Bydgoszcz art, which included works by Maksymilian Piotrowski, Walter Leistikow and other artists. He brought temporary exhibitions to the museum, raising the Bydgoszcz museum among other important national art centers. The Municipal Museum, under his direction, was the seat of numerous cultural and artistic societies and a meeting place for cultural professionals.

=== Second World War ===
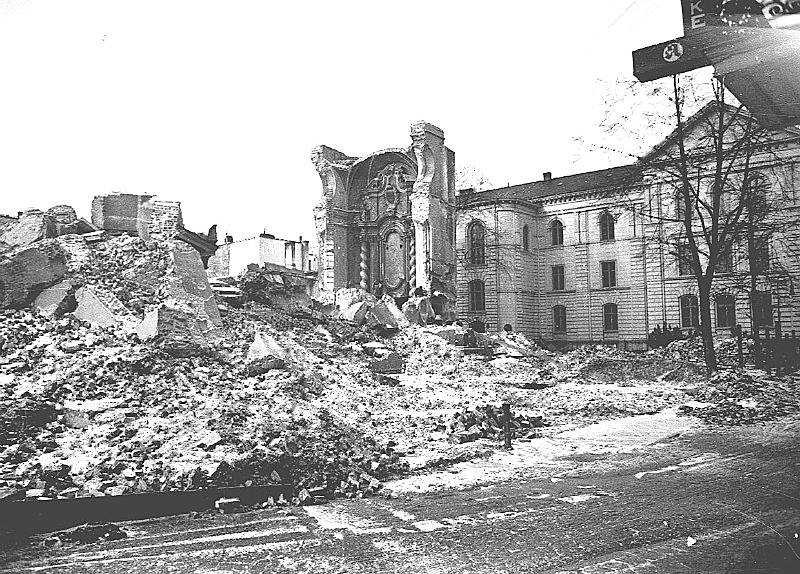
Destruction of buildings on the Old Market Square, 1940

After the outbreak of World War II, Borucki stayed in Bydgoszcz and cared for the museum's artifacts. He patiently secured valuable collections handed over by denizens, including paintings, weapons or coins. He managed with a special attention the liturgical objects coming from Bydgoszcz churches. Thanks to the kindness of the German museum director, Konrad Kothe, Borucki could store many religious artifacts and valuable memorabilia in the museum. Some items were preserved by the city gallery while several others were secured in hidden compartments located in the columns and pillars of the churches. Among the most valuable items hoarded away were the bells of the Bydgoszcz Cathedral and the 15th-century painting of the Bydgoszcz Madonna (Matka Boża Pięknej Miłości w Bydgoszczy).

Prior to the demolition of the Jesuit church and the museum building sitting on the Old Market Square, Kazimierz managed to have valuable artworks and collections moved in December 1939, to the Polish House. This action helped to salvage paintings by Maksymilian Piotrowski (St. Ignatius of Loyola and Immaculate Conception of the Virgin Mary) that used to stand at the main altar of the church, as well as historic church paraments. His achievements allowed as well to save from destruction the painting Our Lady of Górka and historic paraments from the Basilica in Górka Klasztorna near Łobżenica.

Thanks to Konrad Kothe's efforts, the removal of valuable museum objects to the Nazi Germany was halted. In the winter of 1944, some of the artifacts were evacuated to various manor houses around Bydgoszcz, fearing bombing. Only a small portion of the removed artifacts survived.

For his participation as a private to the Home Army, Kazimierz Borucki was eventually sent in the middle of 1944, to a forced labor site in Popioły near Aleksandrów Kujawski.

=== Post war years ===
After liberation, Borucki resumed his position of curator of the City museum. Thanks to his efforts, the institution moved to a new location, in the former Poor Clares Convent at 4 Gdańska Street, which served as a military hospital during the conflict.

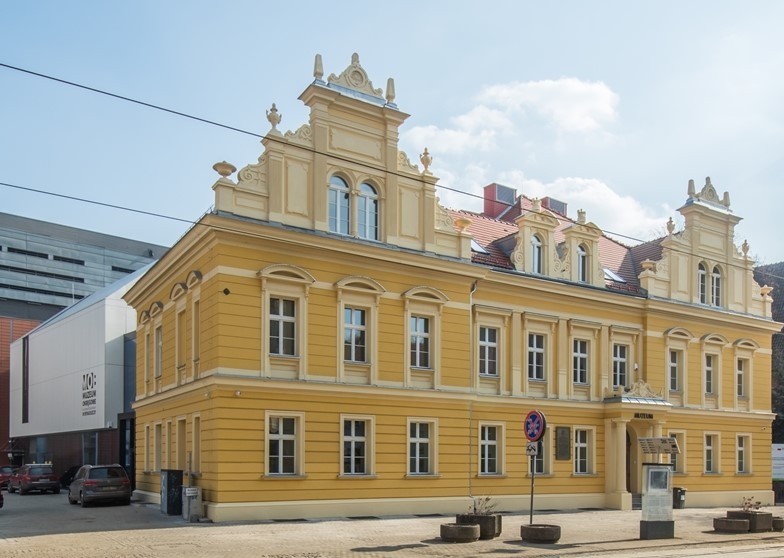
District Museum Building

On 1 April 1946, he was appointed director of the newly created Leon Wyczółkowski Regional Museum, a position he held until his retirement in 1965.

Over the years, he made numerous modifications and adaptations to the building's needs. In particular, he established individual departments:

- Archaeology;
- City history;
- Polish art;
- a separate department devoted to Leon Wyczółkowski works;
- a research and education department, focused on promoting art.

Kazimierz Borucki died on 11 February 1986, in Bydgoszcz. He was buried at the Nowofarny Cemetery in Bydgoszcz.

== Social and scientific activities ==
Kazimierz Borucki actively participated in numerous artistic, scientific, and social organizations and associations, among others:

- he was a founding member of the Towarzystwo Miłośników Miasta Bydgoszczy (Bydgoszcz City Lovers' Society) in 1923. He served as vice-chairman and chairman of the board of the association and was an honorary member of that organization from 1967;
- in 1935, he co-founded the Towarzystwa Numizmatycznego w Bydgoszczy (Bydgoszcz City Numismatic Society),
- he also co-founded the Bydgoszcz branch of Polskiego Towarzystwa Archeologicznego (Polish Archaeological Society), serving as its president from 1954 and receiving in 1966 an honorary membership;
- in 1926, he joined the Pomeranian branch of the Związek Polskich Artystów Plastyków (Association of Visual Artists);
- he participated in the work of the Rada Artystyczno-Kulturalna w Bydgoszczy (Artistic-Cultural Council in Bydgoszcz) established in 1934;
- from 1931, he became involved in the activities of the Towarzystwo Przyjaciół Sztuki w Bydgoszczy (Bydgoszcz Society of Friends of Art in Bydgoszcz);
- he was a member of the Association of Museums in Poland.
- after the war (1954), he worked for the Bydgoszcz Scientific Society.

Furthermore, Kazimierz was also a journalist and author of numerous scholarly and popular science works on art history, museum studies and the history of the city.

He left behind several paintings, particularly with religious themes.

== Personal life ==
In addition to Leon Wyczółkowski, Borucki had many other artistic acquaintances: his closest friends were painter Franciszek Gajewski and sculptor Piotr Triebler.

Kazimierz Borucki married in February 1923 to Gertruda Elżbieta née Piotrowska. The couple had three children: Aurelia Elżbieta (born 1926), Wojciech Jerzy (born 1930) and Andrzej Kazimierz (born 1933). Aurelia (Borucka-Nowicka) hold the position of director of the Regional Museum of Bydgoszcz -like her father- from 1989 to 1995.

After his retirement, Kazimierz's family moved to a flat at 21 Gdańska Street where he devoted himself to his passion – art conservation.

== Awards and Commemorations ==
- Medal of the 10th Anniversary of Regained Independence (1929);
- Badge Za Waleczność (For Valor) (1934), awarded to reward the merits of participants in the Greater Poland Uprising (1918–1919);
- Front Pomorski badge (1934), as having served in a unit of the Polish Army with the aim of regaining Eastern Pomerania;
- Silver Cross of Merit (1937);
- Cross of Independence (1938);
- Silver Medal of the 600th Anniversary of Bydgoszcz (1946);
- Golden Cross of Merit (1955);
- Pro Ecclesia et Pontifice Medal (1957), awarded for saving sacred artifacts;
- Medal of the 10th Anniversary of People's Poland (1958);
- Badge Bydgoszcz to the Distinguised Citizens (1960);
- Golden Badge of the Association of Polish Artists and Designers (1977);
- Knight's Cross of the Order of Polonia Restituta (1978).

One of the streets in Fordon district was named after Kazimierz Borucki (Nad Wisłą estate).

== Gallery ==
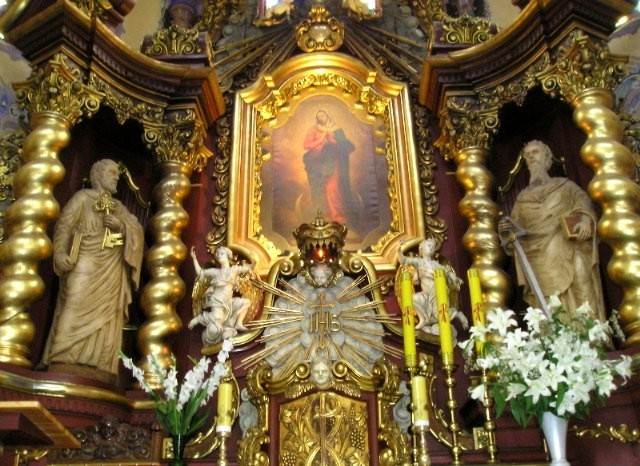
Maksymilian Piotrowski's Immaculate Conception, today located above the main altar in St Peter's and St Paul's Church

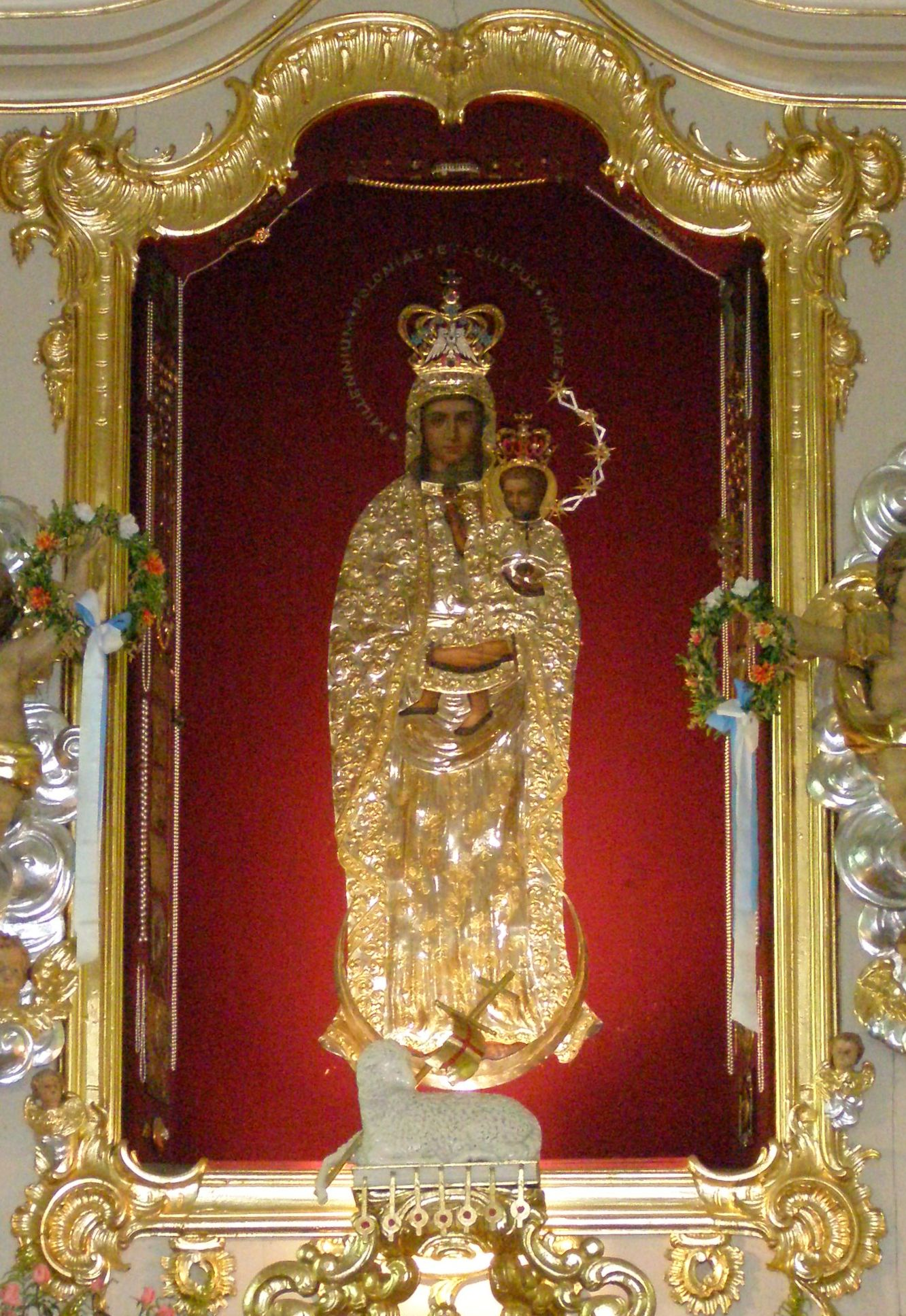
Our Lady of Górecka, saved from destruction during the occupation.

== See also ==
- Bydgoszcz
- Regional Museum in Bydgoszcz
- Polish House, Bydgoszcz
- List of Polish people
- Teodor and Franciszek Gajewski
- Piotr Triebler

== Bibliography ==
- Błażejewski, Stanisław; Kutta, Janusz; Romaniuk, Marek (1995). Bydgoski Słownik Biograficzny. Tom II [Bydgoszcz Biographical Dictionary. Volume II] (in Polish). Bydgoszcz: Dafa. pp. 38–40. ISBN 83-85327274.
