= Poniec =

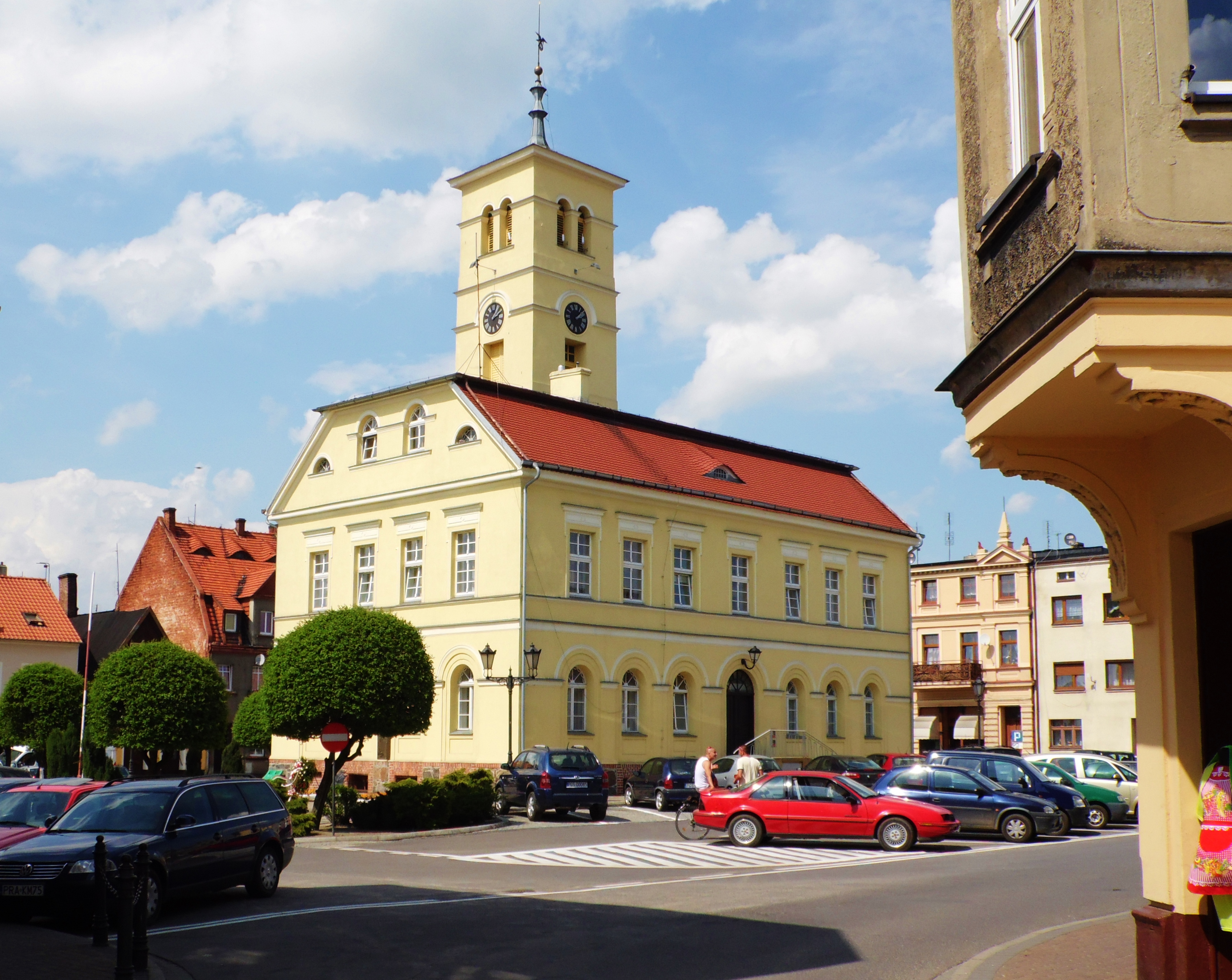
- Town Hall (Ratusz) at the Market Square (Rynek)

- Coat of arms

- Location within Poland
- Coordinates: 51°45′30″N 16°49′0″E
- Country: Poland
- Voivodeship: Greater Poland Voivodeship
- County: Gostyń
- Gmina: Poniec
- First mentioned: 1108
- Town rights: before 1309

Area
  - Total: 3.54 km^{2} (1.37 sq mi)

Population (2023)
  - Total: 2,912
  - Density: 823/km^{2} (2,130/sq mi)
- Time zone: UTC+1 (CET)
  - Summer (DST): UTC+2 (CEST)
- Postal code: 64-125
- Vehicle registration: PGS
- Website: http://www.poniec.pl/

Poniec [ˈpɔɲɛt͡s] is a town in western Poland, situated in the southern part of the Greater Poland Voivodeship. The town has 2912 inhabitants (as of 2023). It is the capital of Gmina Poniec (commune) in Gostyń County.

== History ==
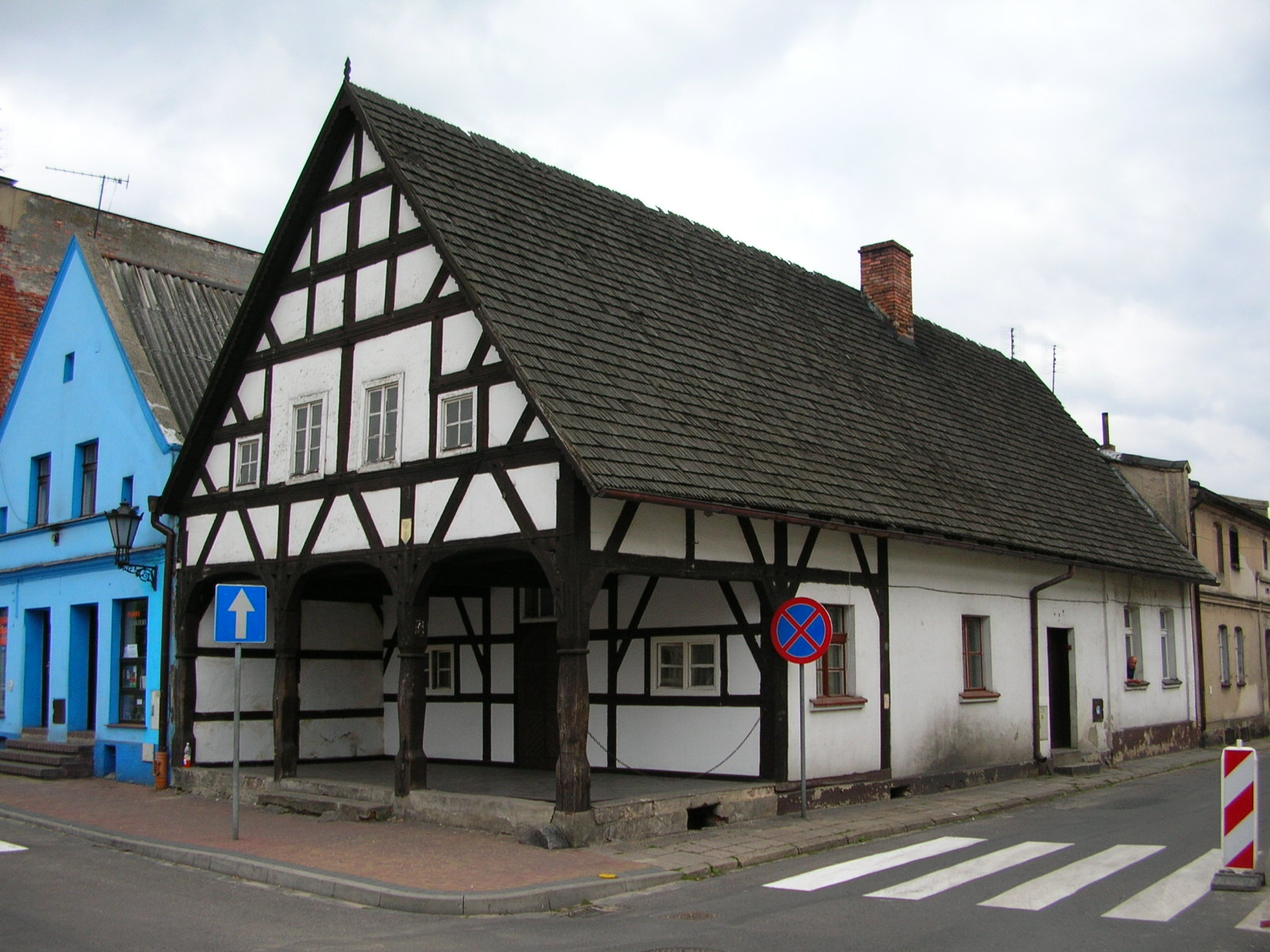
Old arcaded house at the Market Square

Poniec dates back to the 10th century, when it was part of the emerging Polish state. The oldest known mention comes from 1108. It was granted town rights before 1309. It was a private town, administratively located in the Kościan County in the Poznań Voivodeship in the Greater Poland Province. Crafts, especially clothmaking, developed and the town prospered until the Swedish invasion of Poland in 1655–1660. The Battle of Poniec occurred nearby on 28 October 1704 during the Great Northern War.

After the Second Partition of Poland, in 1793 it was annexed by Prussia. After the successful Greater Poland uprising of 1806, it was regained by Poles and included within the short-lived Duchy of Warsaw. In 1815 it was re-annexed by Prussia. The local population was subjected to harsh Germanisation policies, however local Poles established various organizations, including a local branch of the "Sokół" Polish Gymnastic Society. Many inhabitants took part in the Greater Poland uprising (1918–19), after which Poniec was reintegrated with Poland in 1919, shortly after it regained independence.

During the invasion of Poland, which started World War II, German troops entered the town on 6 September 1939. The Polish population was subjected to arrests, executions and expulsions. In the following months, many residents were imprisoned in the town hall. On 21 October 1939 the Germans carried out a public execution of local Poles. It was one of many massacres of Poles committed by Germany on 20–23 October 1939 across the region in attempt to pacify and terrorize the Polish population. Over 300 Poles were expelled to the General Government, mostly to Tarnów. First Polish families were expelled in December 1939. Many inhabitants were taken to forced labour or murdered in concentration camps. The town was captured by the Soviets in January 1945 and afterwards restored to Poland.

From 1975 to 1998, it was administratively located in the Leszno Voivodeship.

== Demographics ==
Historical population

Year	Pop.	±%
1880	2,008	—
1890	2,004	−0.2%
1910	2,817	+40.6%
1921	2,471	−12.3%
1931	2,626	+6.3%

Year	Pop.	±%
1939	3,246	+23.6%
1950	2,337	−28.0%
1960	2,672	+14.3%
2010	2,851	+6.7%
2023	2,912	+2.1%

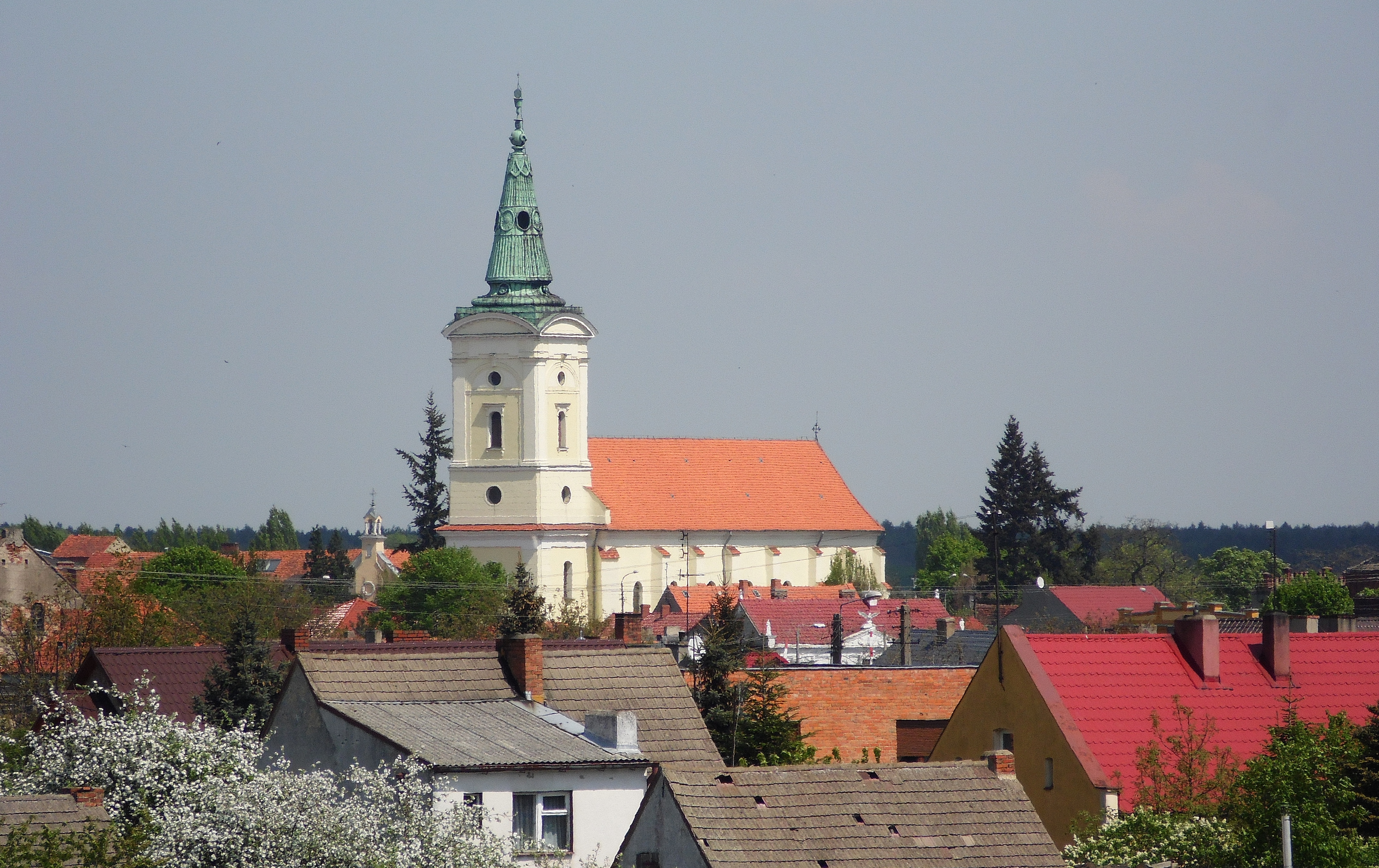
Church of the Nativity of the Virgin Mary

== Emergency services ==
Since late 19th century there is an active volunteer fire department called Ochotnicza Straż Pożarna Poniec as well as old police station used by Policja.

== Transport ==
There is an active train station in Poniec with historical Prussian station building. As well as one Bus route going through town to Leszno

== Culture ==
Dziecięco-Młodzieżowa Orkiestra Dęta przy GCK w Poniecu, wind orchestra composed of volunteer (non-paid) amateur musicians works in town as a part of Municipal Cultural Center (Gminne Centrum Kultury). The orchestra is present during most holidays, e.g. Polish Independence Day or International Firefighters' Day. The orchestra also organizes New Year's Concerts for thousands of people from all over the country every year, inspired by the Vienna New Year's Concerts. In 2023 the orchestra won the title of Vice-Champion of Poland in Polish Wind Band Championships in Radom. In addition to the many awards regularly won by the orchestra at national festivals, it is worth mentioning the two greatest International successes. In 2018 the band won three awards during the International Brass Band Festival in Giulianova, Italy: Best Youth Brass Band, Best Brass Band and Best Conductor of the Festival. Another important success was participation in Rasteder Musitage in Germany. The band, although initially entered into the basic category, was moved to the advanced group at the jury's request and received very high marks from each of the jurors; out of 100 possible points, the orchestra scored 86.17, which qualified it for the gold medal. The orchestra was also awarded honorary badge of Merit for Polish Culture (Zasłużony dla Kultury Polskiej) in 2022.

Also since 2018 one of the largest Rally of Historical Reenactment Groups in Greater Poland takes place in Poniec. The annual, several-day event is organized under the name "Operacja Poniec" (Operation Poniec) consists of a parade around the market square, the camp area open to visitors, with dioramas and reenactors' camps located in the City Park, outdoor cinema and historical battle reenactments. Groups taking part in the event recreate soldiers and civilians from every point in history, from the Middle Ages and the Battle of Grunwald, through the Swedish Invasion of Poland, the Napoleonic Wars, World War I and World War II, Cold War conflicts such as Northern Ireland and Vietnam, to modern troops including the German Bundeswehr. The largest one yet was IV Operacja Poniec in 2023 with 36 groups and dozens of reenactors from all over Poland.

== Sports ==
The town's most notable sports club is Piast Poniec with football, volleyball, table tennis and futsal sections.

== Notable people ==
- Edmund Charaszkiewicz (1895-1975), intelligence officer.
- Bernard Śliwiński (1883-1941), doctor of law, commander during the Greater Poland uprising, Lieutenant colonel in the Polish Armed Forces infantry, district commander of the state police, Mayor of Bydgoszcz and recipient of the Knight's Cross of the Order of Virtuti Militari.
