= Bernard Śliwiński =

Polish lawyer, politician, national activist.(1818-1889)

Bernard Stanisław Śliwiński
- Bernard Stanisław Śliwiński
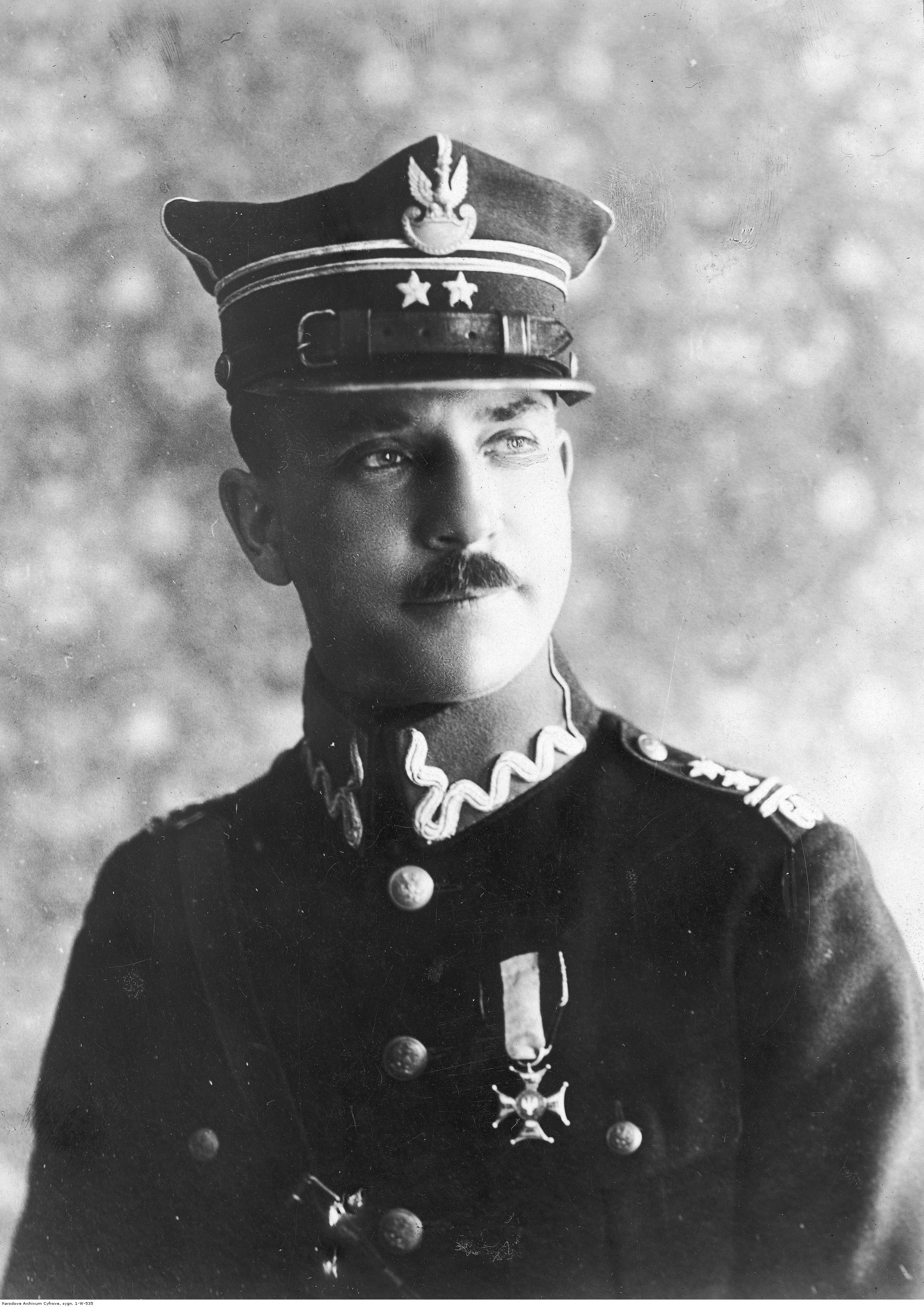
- Bernard Śliwiński
- Born: July 5, 1883; Poniec, Province of Posen Prussia
- Died: December 18, 1941 (aged 58); Neubrandenburg, Nazi Germany
- Occupations: Lawyer, activist, lieutenant colonel in the Polish Armed Forces infantry
- Known for: Insurgent during the Greater Poland uprising, Mayor of Bydgoszcz
- Awards

Bernard Stanisław Śliwiński (1883-1941) was a Polish doctor of law, insurgent during the Greater Poland uprising, lieutenant colonel in the Polish Armed Forces infantry, district commander of the state police, Mayor of Bydgoszcz and recipient of the Knight's Cross of the Order of Virtuti Militari.

== Biography ==
=== Early life ===
Bernard Śliwiński was born on July 5, 1883, in Poniec in the Province of Posen, then part of the Kingdom of Prussia. He was the son of Roman, a butcher's master, and Antonina née Present. He passed his secondary school-leaving examination (Abitur) at the gymnasium of Wschowa.

He was a member of the Tomasz Zan Society, a youth independence organization and secret student association fighting against Germanization and censorship of Polish culture. He studied law at the Humboldt University of Berlin and the University of Wrocław. In the course of his studies, from 1907 to 1908, Śliwiński performed his compulsory military service in the Imperial German Army: he completed it as a sergeant and was promoted in 1912 to the rank of Second lieutenant.

He eventually obtained the title of doctor of law in 1911, delivered by the University of Wrocław. Once graduated, Bernard worked from 1911 to 1914 in the judiciary domain as a court referendary.

At the outset of World War I, he was mobilized into the army of the German Empire, fighting on the Western Front. In June 1917, he was promoted to the rank of lieutenant.

=== Greater Poland uprising (1918–1919) ===
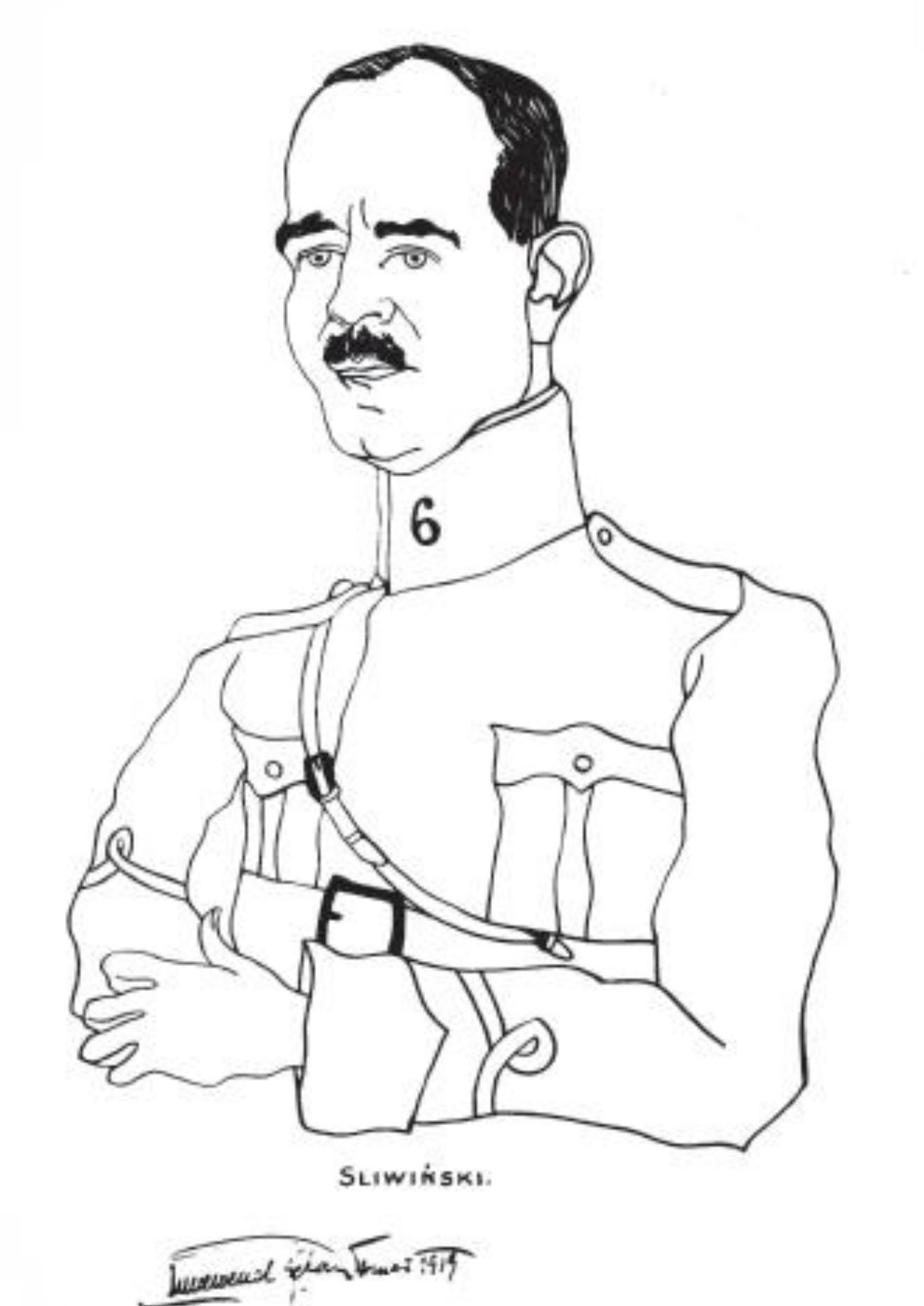
Caricature by Stefan Sonnewend

In November 1918, Śliwiński witnessed the German Revolution in Berlin. Following these events, he gave up his German uniform and returned to Greater Poland (Polish: Wielkopolska). In December 1918, he was a candidate to the People's Council in Poznań, a Polish committee which played a critical role during the uprising.

Thanks to his contacts in the "Polish-German Workers' and Soldiers' Council" in Poniec and the "Powiat People's Council" of Gostyń, Bernard was entrusted in 1919 with the leadership of the uprising in the Gostyń County. He ordered the announcement of a mass action in powiat and organized a battalion to defend Poniec, threatened by German troops in Rawicz.

In January 1919, he was officially nominated commander of the Leszno section by the military command in Poznań. In early February 1919, Śliwiński started to form and train the "60th Infantry Regiment of Wielkopolska", part of the 15th Infantry Division. He fought in this regiment until July 30, 1919. In the fall of 1919, he moved with the "6th Greater Poland Rifle Regiment" to the city of Zbąszyń for recovering.

On December 18, 1919, this regiment translated to Bydgoszcz area, near Żnin. On January 20, 1920, Bernard Śliwiński entered Bydgoszcz at the head of the regiment, hence formally welcoming the city back to the Polish territory. In the following days, he also seized Świecie, Koronowo and Tuchola. During the year 1919, he was successively promoted to the rank of lieutenant in January, Captain in March and Major in June.

In the beginning of February 1920, having billeted his regiment in Koronowo, he was transferred to Bydgoszcz.

=== Polish–Soviet War ===
As part of the Polish–Soviet War, Śliwiński set off with his regiment to Brody in Eastern Małopolska (today in western Ukraine) on March 8, 1920. He took part in the Kiev offensive in Ukraine (April–May 1920) and on the Lithuanian-Belarusian front. He received the rank of lieutenant colonel on April 1, 1920. Wounded, he was treated from July to October 1920 in a hospital in Poznań, before returning to his unit. He had a reputation for being an appreciated commander, taking care of his soldiers.

At the end of the conflict (October 1920), Bernard Śliwiński commanded the "6th Greater Poland Rifle Regiment" and then "19th Infantry Brigade" in Inowrocław. In 1921, he was transferred to the reserve.

Eventually, from February 4, 1921, to mid-1922, he was a police inspector, commanding the "11th District Command of the state police" in Poznań.

=== Mayor of Bydgoszcz ===
In January 1922, Bernard Śliwiński stood as a candidate for the position of Mayor of Bydgoszcz and was elected by the city council on May 4. He was sworn in on July 27 and took his new post on August 1, 1922.

His vision for Bydgoszcz was to have a great city, a center of trade and industry in the western borderlands of Poland, a strong fortress of Polishness (Polish: wielkim miastem, ośrodkiem handlu i przemysłu na kresach zachodnich Polski, mocną twierdzą polskości). At the beginning of his term, Śliwiński aimed to have Bydgoszcz integrated into the then Pomeranian Voivodeship and the seat of the voivodeship transferred to his city. He conducted negotiations on the move the Railway Directorate from Danzig to Bydgoszcz, but to no avail. Furthermore, he fought to provide the city with reliable telephone communications with the other major cities of the country.

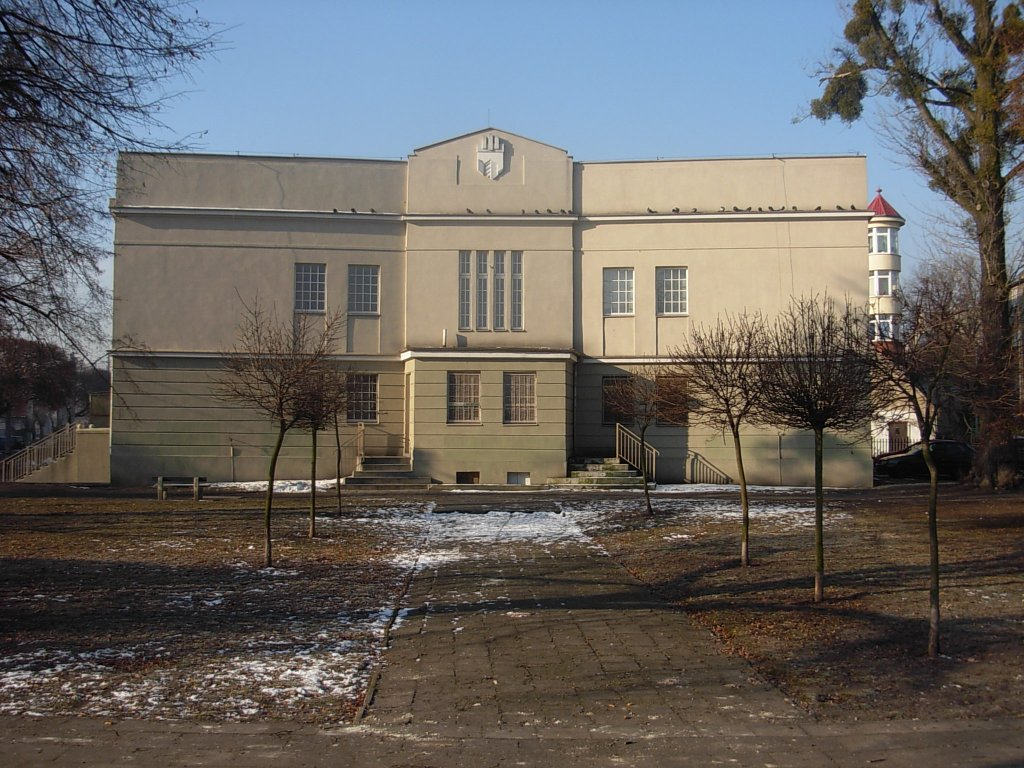
Ancient bathhouse in Szwederowo

In the 1920s, a project of canal to bring coal from Silesia to Danzig was considered and Śliwiński lobbied with the Chamber of Industry and Commerce to have it integrated with the existing local network. The scheme, however, was never developed further. Conversely, his actions allowed the Polish Coal Trunk-Line to go through Bydgoszcz in the early 1930s.

With the economic revival in the country from 1926 to 1929, he took care of the development of housing construction. From these actions, one can mention the following achievements:

- functional apartments (e.g. workers' houses in Ludwikowo and Biedaszkowo districts);
- a home for the elderly at Grudziądzka street;
- a bathhouse facility in Szwederowo district;
- the project of a large city hospital.

Under his tenure, the municipality also organized work for the unemployed and fought the rising prices consequent to the Great Depression.

Together with engineer Ludwik Regamey, Śliwiński supported the construction of the power plant in Jachcice district, at the time a rural area in the north-west part of the city. The plant has been supplying the municipal district heating network with hot water for more than 90 years.

During his presidency, Bydgoszcz grew and developed, its sewerage and water supply networks extended. During this period, the Municipal Construction Office planned the expansion of the city, providing for the growth of the city up to 600,000 residents.

As far as education and culture are concerned, the city offered land for the construction of a polytechnic university, allocating the missing funds. Śliwiński took care of the development of the Municipal Theatre. He also actively supported the establishment in 1923 of the Regional Museum.

Various city organizations and associations were bolstered, such as the initiative of Witold Bełza to establish the "Society of the Lovers of the City of Bydgoszcz" (Polish: Towarzystwo Miłośników Miasta Bydgoszczy) in February 1923: he became its first president (1923-1925). From 1925 to 1927, he was a member of the "construction committee of the Monument to Henryk Sienkiewicz", which was unveiled in July 1927, under the auspices of the president Ignacy Mościcki.

While a mayor, Bernard Śliwiński donated books to the Municipal Library and founded a stained glass (1924) in the newly erected Saint Stanislaus of Szczepanów's Church in Siernieczek district and an altar frontal (1925) at the St. Martin and Nicholas church.

His activity in Bydgoszcz was often attacked at meetings of the city council and in the local press. His opponents were mainly found among the socialists and national democrats. In 1925, a campaign was launched against him and lasted several years. It ended up with his removal from the city office in November 1930, suspended by a vote of the municipal council. His duties were taken over by his vice-president, Tadeusz Chmielarski.

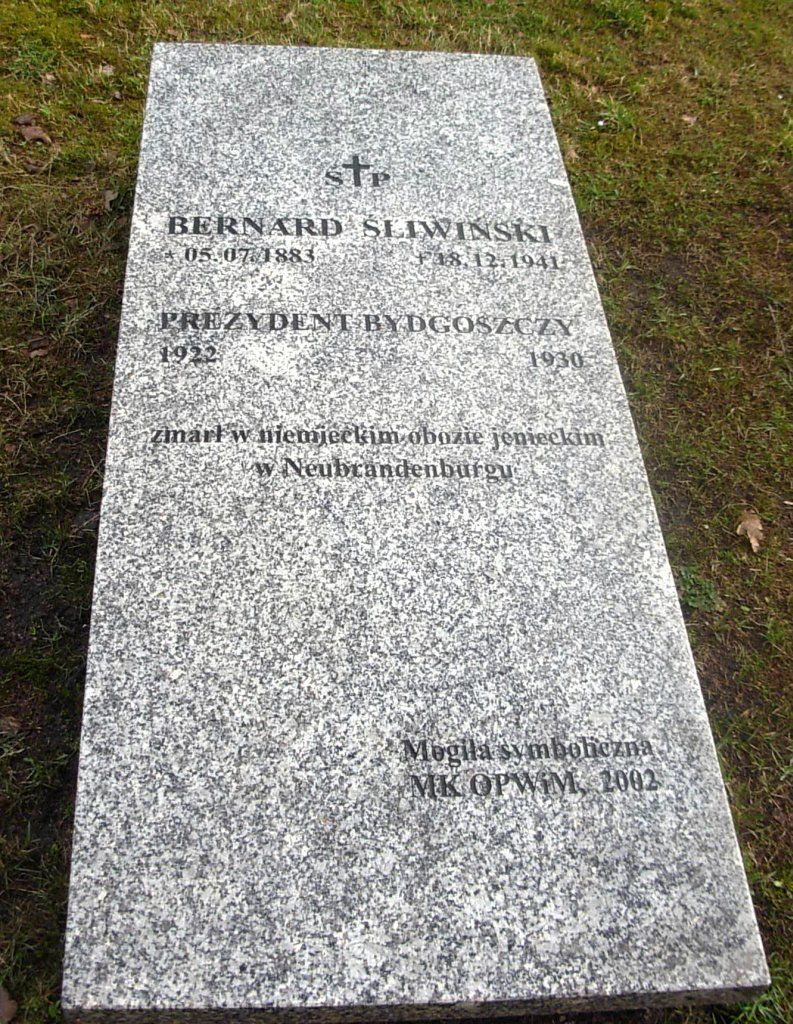
Śliwiński's cenotaph in Bydgoszcz Heroes cemetery

=== Activities in Poznań ===
At the end of 1930, Bernard Śliwiński moved to Poznań and worked there as an attorney.

Concurrently, he participated actively in organizations linked with the former Greater Poland uprising. He was one of the organizers and chairman of the "Union of Insurgents and Soldiers" in Poznań. In January 1938, he was elected to the Main Board of the "Association of Greater Poland Insurgents" (Polish: Związek Powstańców Wielkopolskich), gathering ancient fighters of this period.

Between 1930 and 1939, he also published many valuable articles and memoirs about Greater Poland uprising, mainly in the pages of local magazine "Kronika Gostyńska".

=== Second World War ===
On September 1, 1939, at the start of the German invasion of Poland, Śliwiński took command of a regiment from the Poznań National Defense Brigade, which included three battalions of the National Defense ("Obrona Narodowa", ON).

He took part in the "September campaign" of 1939, in particular the Battle of the Bzura. After the defeat, he was imprisoned in the Oflag II E near Neubrandenburg, where he died on December 18, 1941.

== Family ==
Bernard Śliwiński married Marianna née Ciechowicz in 1922.

They had two sons: Roman Marian (1928-1944) and Tomasz Augustyn (b.1930).

== Orders and commemorations ==
- Silver Cross of the Virtuti Militari
- Golden Cross of Merit
- Cross of Independence
- Cross of Valour in 1921
- Knight of the Légion d'honneur (France)

A street in Bydgoszcz district of Bartodzieje is named after him (Ulica Bernarda Śliwińskiego) as well as in Poniec, his home town.

The primary school in Poniec has been named after him. In addition his house in the city now bears a commemorative plaque since April 5, 1988.

== Gallery ==
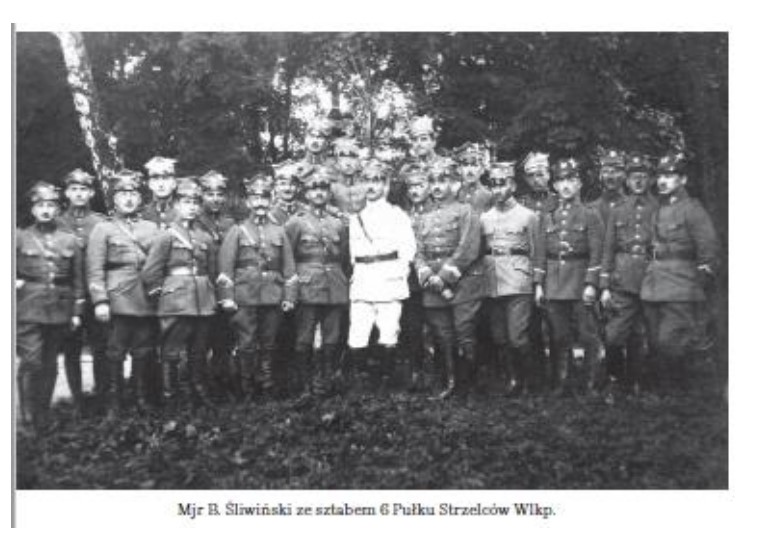
Bernard Śliwiński (middle) and his HQ, 1919

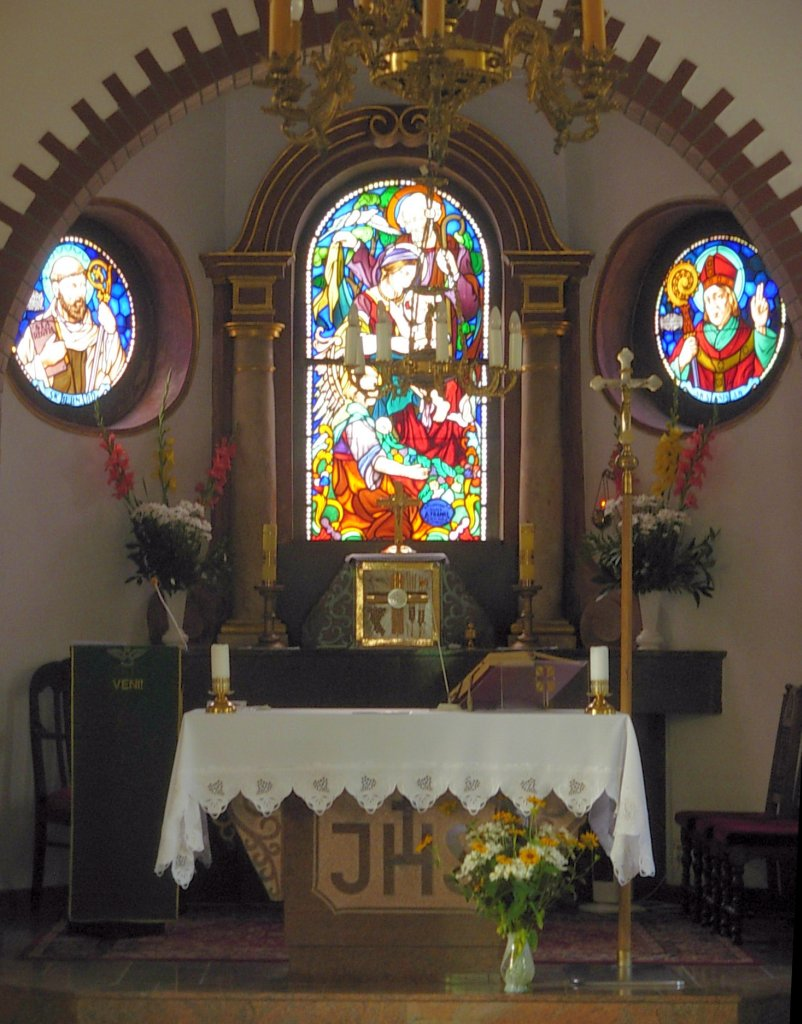
Stained glass window donated by Śliwiński in St Stanislaus Church

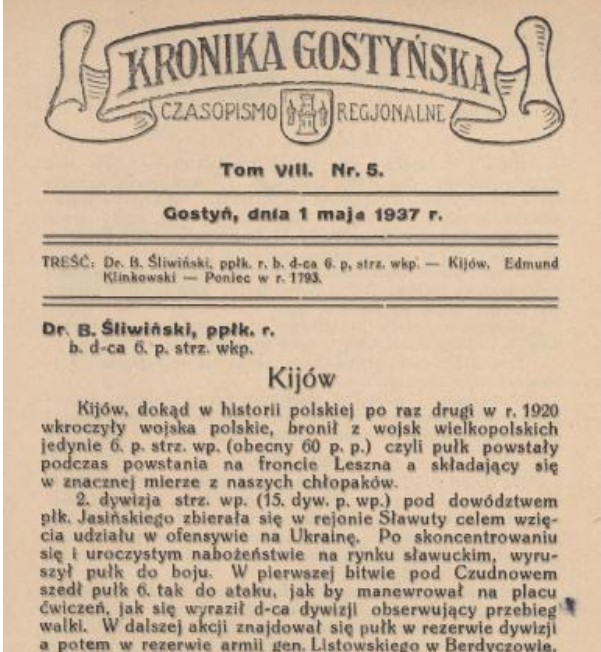
One of his articles published in the Kronika Gostyńska, 1937

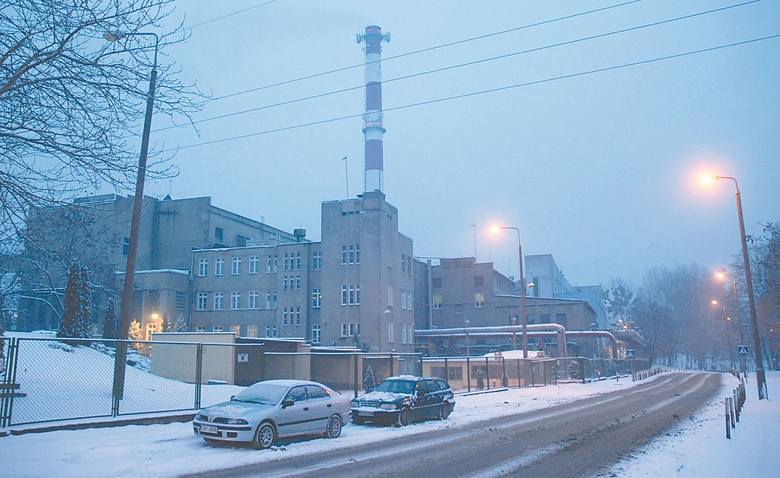
Jachnice power plant today

== See also ==
- Bydgoszcz
- Partitions of Poland
- Resistance movements in partitioned Poland (1795–1918)
- List of Polish people

== Bibliography ==
- (in Polish) Błażejewski Stanisław, Kutta Janusz, Romaniuk Marek (1995). Bydgoski Słownik Biograficzny. Tom II. Bydgoszcz: Kujawsko-Pomorskie Towarzystwo Kulturalne Wojewódzki Ośrodek Kultury. pp. 139–142. ISBN 8385327274.
- (in Polish) Śliwiński, Eugeniusz (2018). Południowo-zachodnia Wielkopolska w powstaniu 1918/1919 roku (PDF). Leszno: Archiwum Państwowe w Lesznie. ISBN 9788394702557.
- (in Polish) Polak, Bogusław Stanisław (2018). Dowódca Grupy "Leszno". Ppłk dr Bernard Śliwiński 1883-1941. Leszno: Urząd Miasta Leszna ; Miejska Biblioteka Publiczna im. Stanisława Grochowiaka w Lesznie.
- (in Polish) Kazimierz, Pindel (1979). Obrona narodowa 1937-1939. Warszawa: Wydawnictwo Ministerstwa Obrony Narodowej.
