= Grodzka Street, Bydgoszcz =

Historical street in Bydgoszcz, Poland

Coordinates: 53°07′20″N 18°00′12″E

Grodzka Street
Bydgoszcz
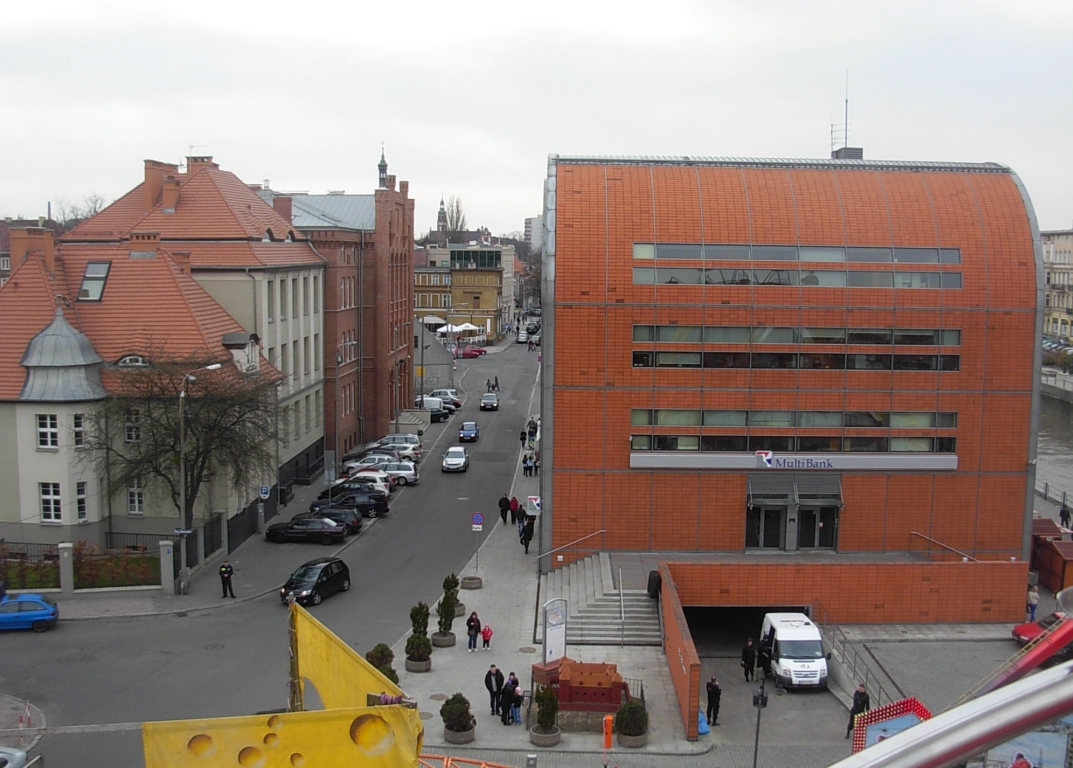
- View to the east

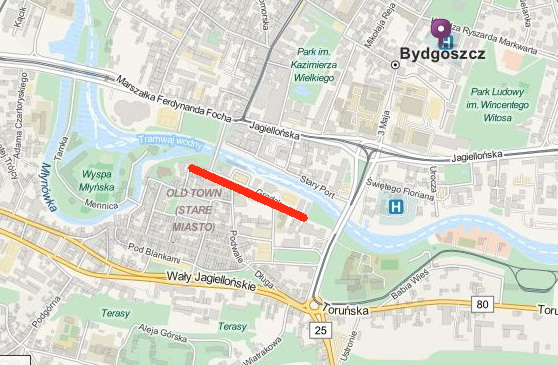
- Grodzka street highlighted in red
- Native name: Ulica Grodzka w Bydgoszczy (Polish)
- Former name: Mühlenstraße – Schloßstraße – Burgstraße
- Namesake: Bydgoszcz Castle
- Owner: City of Bydgoszcz
- Length: 0.43 km (0.27 mi)
- Area: Old Town Bydgoszcz
- Location: Bydgoszcz, Poland

Grodzka Street is a historical street in Old Town of Bydgoszcz, Poland. The street is located in the northern part of the Old Town: it stretches along Brda River waterfront, following an east–west axis. The street starts at the intersection with Bernardyńska street and ends at Tadeusz Malczewski street's crossing. Its length is approximately 430 m. The Grodzka Street was laid out in mid-14th century, when Bydgoszcz became a charter city. Grodzka Street buildings vary greatly one from the other, beginning with the three historic granaries from late 18th century, to the all-glass similar-shape modern mBank in Bydgoszcz, which became an icon of Polish architecture.

== History ==
The Grodzka Street changed names numerous times in its history. It was known from 16th century to 1750 as "Platea balnealis" (German: Badegasse,Polish: Łazienna) for the western part, "Platea castriensis" for the eastern part. During the 19th century, it was called successively Mühlenstraße (1800–1816), then Alte Mühlenstraße (1840–1861) and Schloßstraße for eastern part of the street (1800–1900). Lastly, in the 20th century, its name was Burgstraße (1901–1920, 1939–1945) and Ulica Grodzka (1920–1939, since 1945).

=== Early history ===
In its eastern part, the street runs through Bydgoszcz oldest settlement, which included Bydgoszcz's early medieval castle from the castellany era and the 14th century castle of Casimir III the Great. The area has been the focus of numerous archaeological excavations, which has intensified since the 1990s, providing a huge amount of information on various aspects of settlement and development of Bydgoszcz.

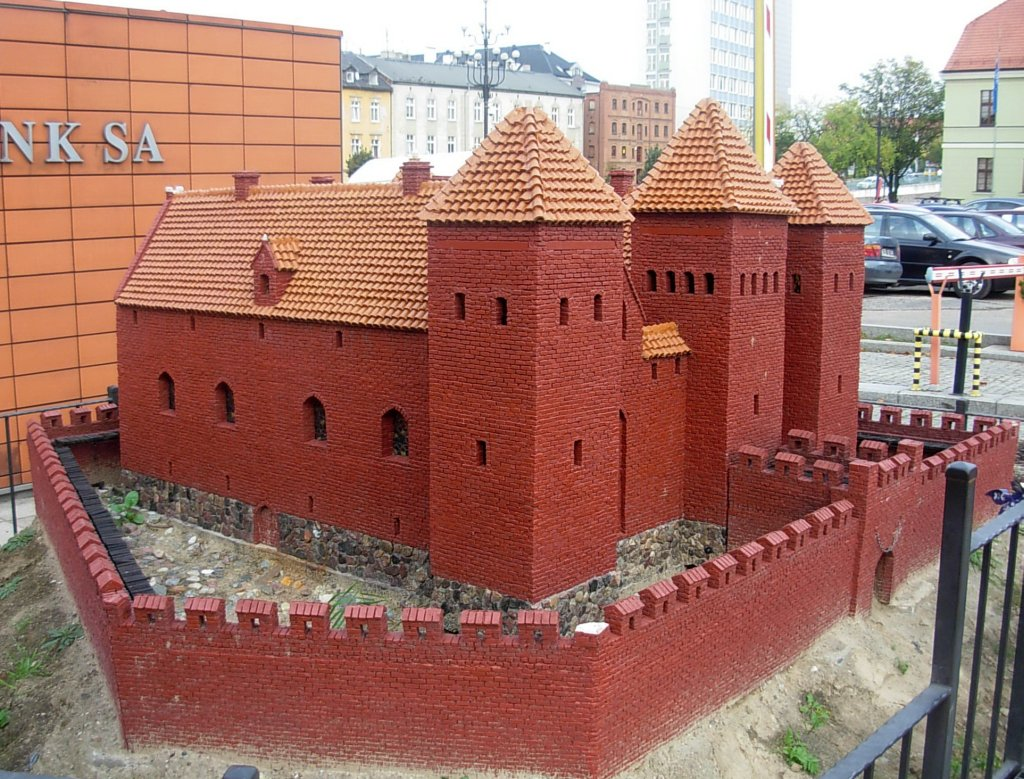
Mock-up of the old castle laid at its very location in Grodzka Street

The first settlement of Bydgoszcz built between 11th and 12th centuries had its footprint in the area of Grodzka Street, between Przy Zamczysku and Bernardyńska streets. First comprehensive archaeological searches conducted in the 1990s led to the discovery of large-scale relics related to the first footprint of Bydgoszcz settlement, with its castle built on an island formed Brda river meanders. It consisted of a fortified area, with log cabin-type housing and utility buildings. In the southern part of this island has been unveiled wooden structures attributed to a harbor on the river. The fortification system has been dated by dendrochronology from 1037 to 1038.

Subsequent excavations have been taken in 2007 in connection with the construction of a Holiday Inn hotel at the confluence of Grodzka and Bernardyńska streets. Findings have complemented previous searches regarding former castle, unveiling among other things, wooden relics of log cabin buildings. Those documents and elements of the early medieval castle are now presented the elements in the district archeological museum in the White Granary on Mill Island.

Archaeological work was also conducted in the middle of the street, at the intersection of Grodzka and Podwale streets. It has unveiled wooden joists piles set on a NE-SW track, interpreted as remnants of a wood surface of today's Kreta street. On the other hand, at the crossing with Mostowa street have been discovered several building layers made of wood and brick. Those edifices are dated back to the second half of the 14th century, for the timber-framed buildings and to the 15th–19th century for brick buildings. Searches also excavated thousands of objects from daily life. In 2014, another study has unveiled a wooden road from the 16th century, preserved in a pretty good state.

=== From 14th to 18th century ===
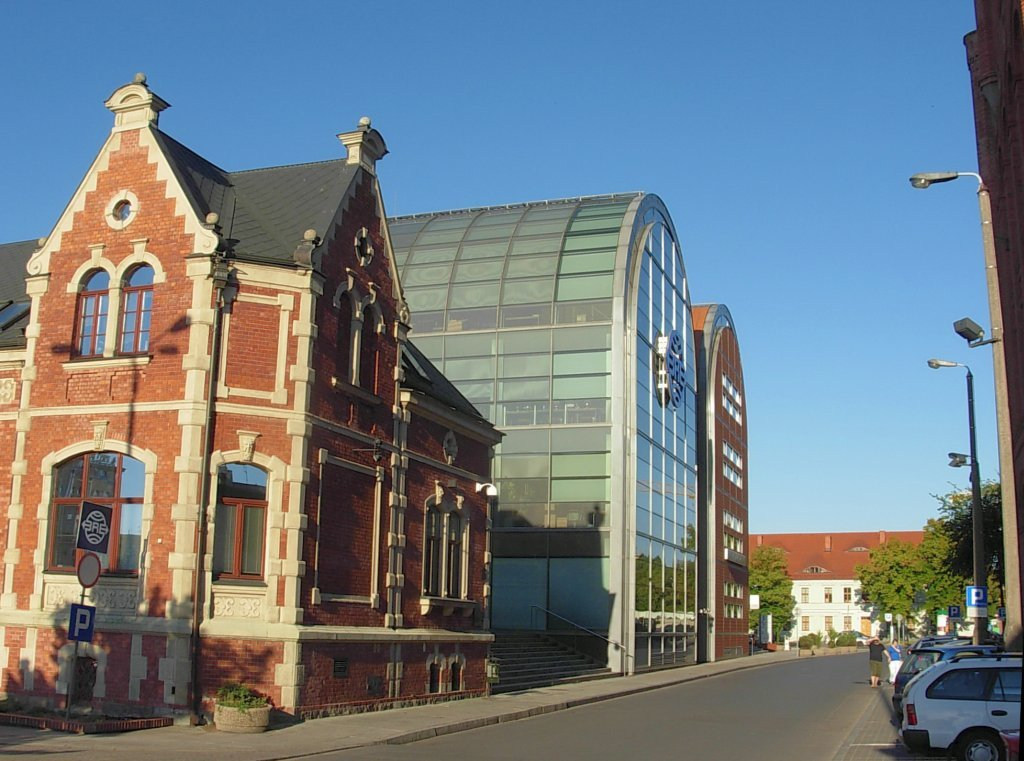
View of Grodzka Street eastward

Until 1772 Grodzka Street was the main axis that spread along the northern edge of the city. Starting at St Martin and St Nicholas cathedral where were laid the city walls, it led to the Old Castle in the east. In 15th and 16th centuries, on the western end of the street was built a bridge connecting to Mill Island in Bydgoszcz, located at Farna weir: it has been demolished since.

With time, southern side of the street developed estate houses, while northern side areas were used for business (granaries and waterfront harbour). In the western end of the street, around the cathedral, there was a municipal cemetery till the end of the 18th century.

==== Public baths ====
The western part of Grodzka Street was called "Łazienna" from polish word for city bath, then located in the area. On June 21, 1549, Andrzej Kościelecki, Bydgoszcz starosta and governor of Poznań, came to terms with the City Council to have public baths built. It was created on Brda river waterfront, but in the absence of reliable sources, the exact location of the property is not known. In 1573, the governor and mayor of Bydgoszcz, Jan Kościelecki, asked the City Council to renovate the devastated public baths, for hygienic purposes. Another mention in the documents dates back to 1717: minor bathing activity was still performed at this time.

==== Grodzka Gate ====
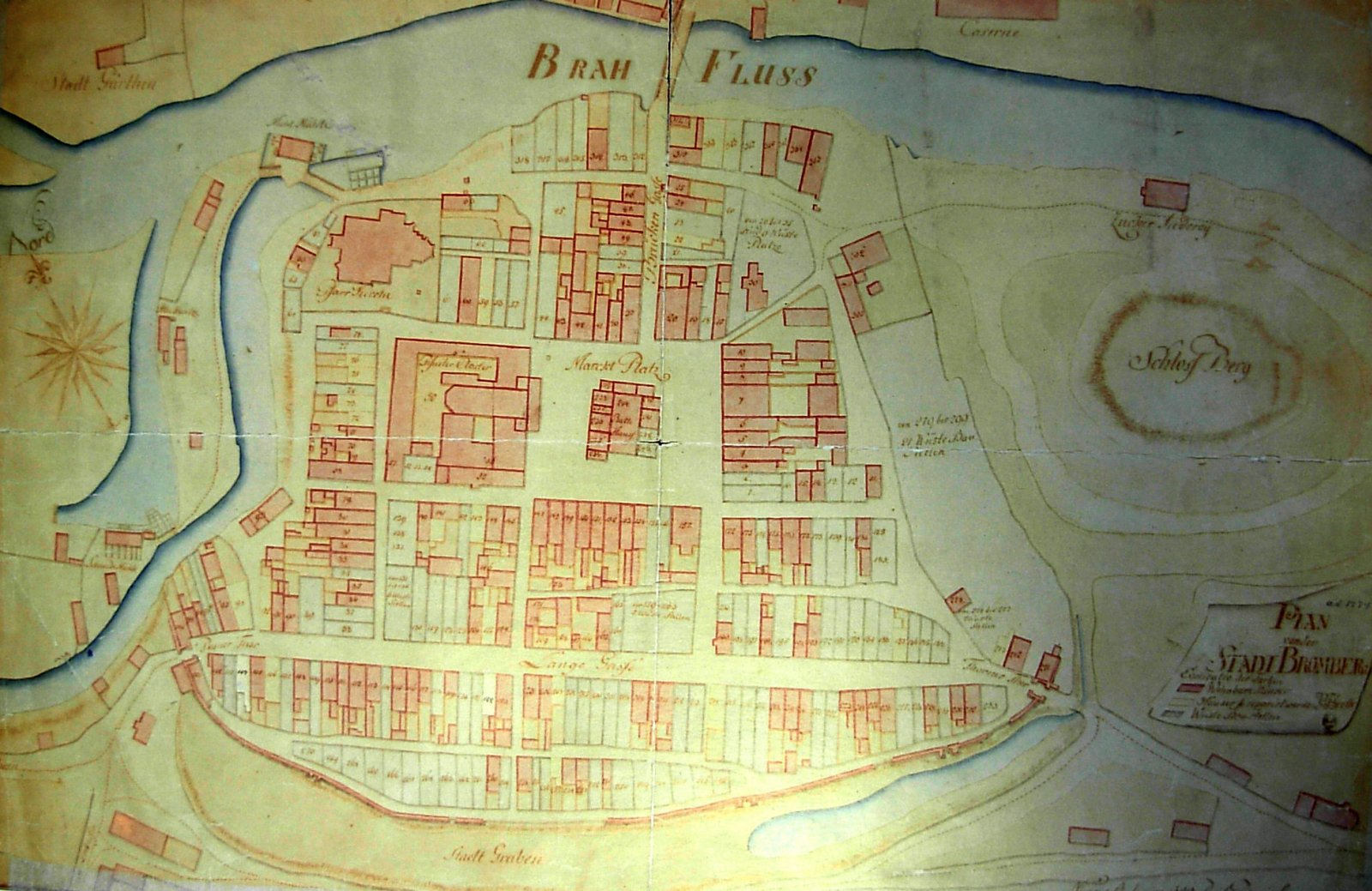
Map of Bydgoszcz by Gretha in 1774

Until 1772, eastern end of today's Grodzka Street was called named "Zamkowej" (polish for Castle), referring to the neighboring town castle to where the street led. Between the city itself and the castle stood a fence or defensive wall, which was pierced at the end of the street by the Grodzka Gate. It had no military importance but was the only connection between the city and the castle. No remains of the door have been ever found during archaeological excavations, but written sources proved its existence. Behind the gate was a bridge over the castle moat.

On the basis of several historical plans (Dahlberg (1657), Gretha (1774), Steermanna (1789), Lindner (1800)) studies have estimated the location of this gate in the area of the intersection of Grodzka and Podwale Streets: between the current Lloyd's Palace and Seminary building (at Nr.16 of Grodzka Street). The Grodzka Gate, along with the city castle were destroyed during Swedish invasions in the 17th century, and never rebuilt.

=== Prussian period ===
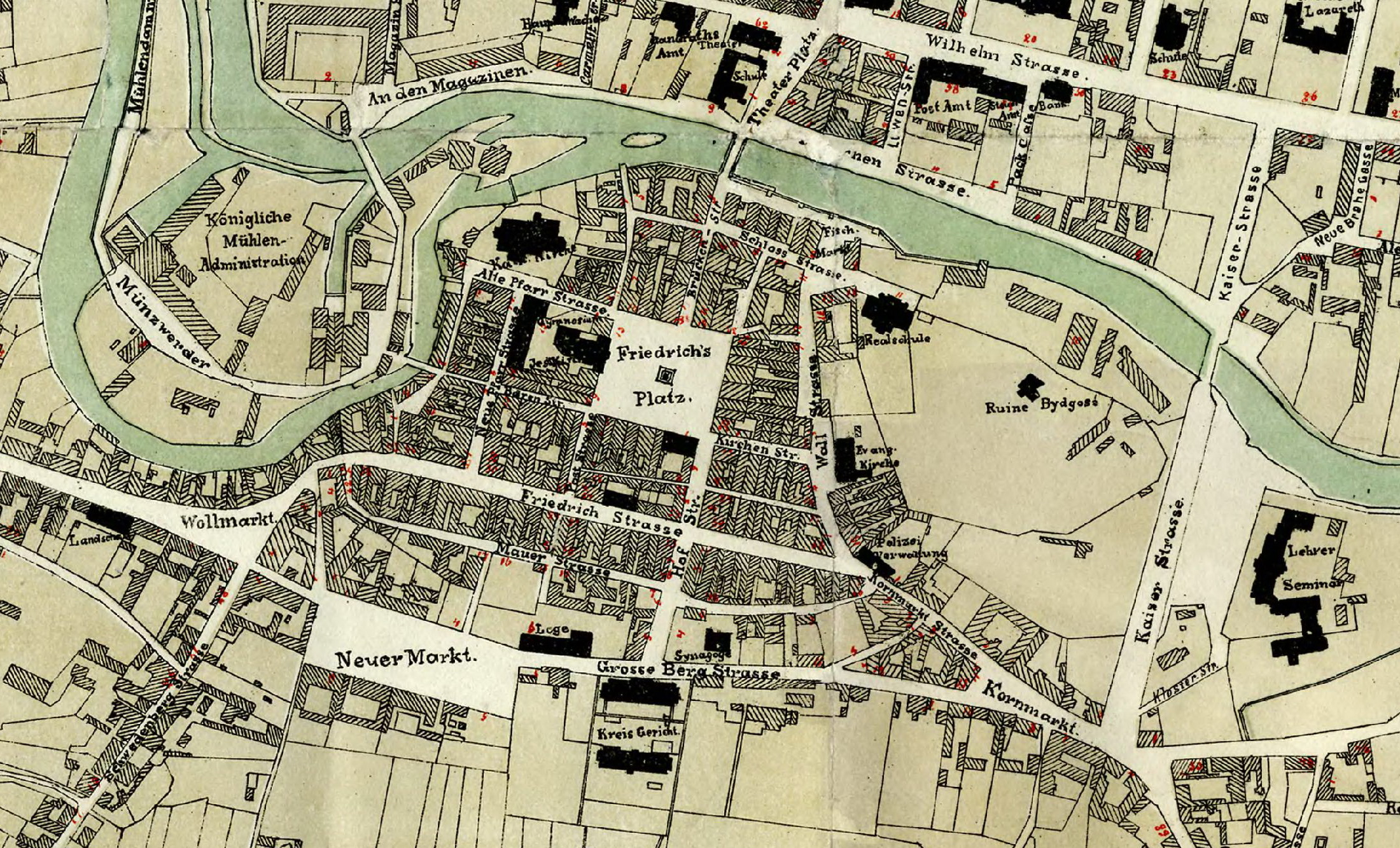
Old town Bydgoszcz in 1876

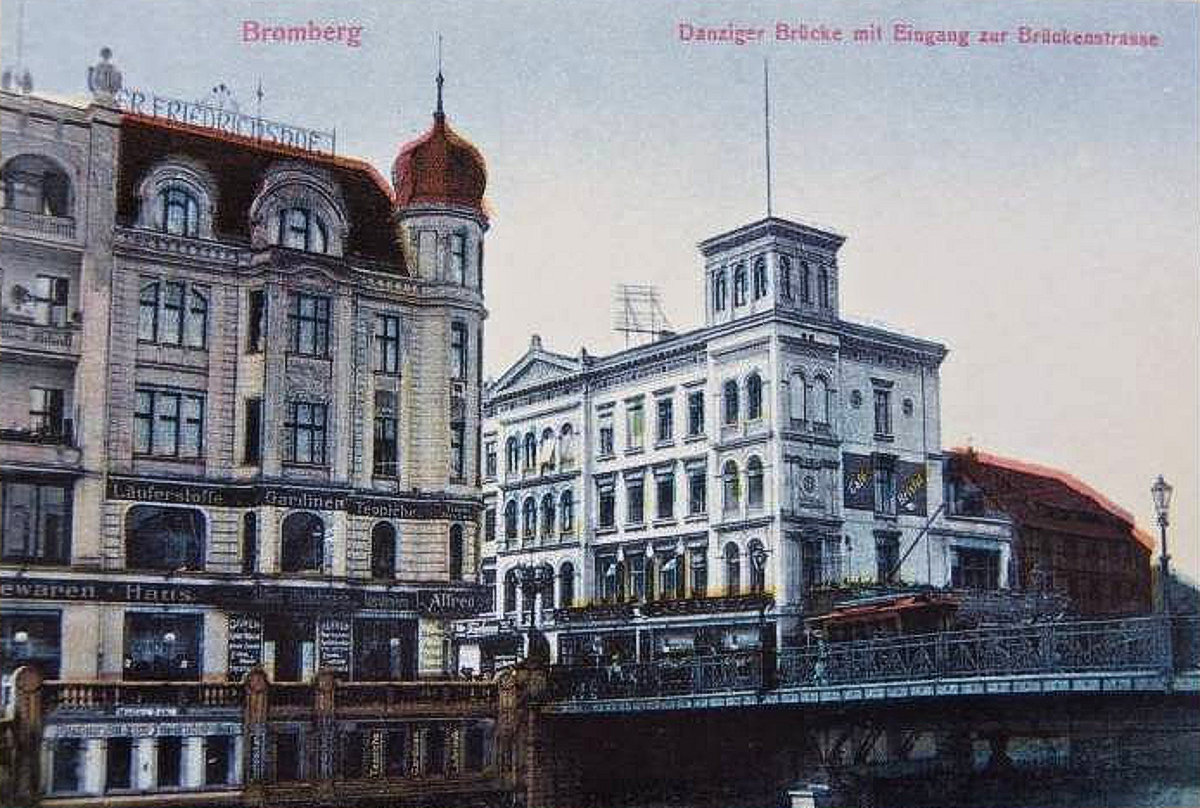
Buildings Jackman and Frederic in Bydgoszcz 1903

On a detailed plan of the city, prepared by the Prussian geometer Gretha in 1774, plots along the street are partially occupied by current buildings. In the western part, the street ran along the municipal cemetery to the bridge connecting Mill Island in Bydgoszcz. On the eastern side, the watered castle moat is still standing. Between the castle and the Brda river stands the cane sugar refinery building (now PZU building). On the map of Lindner from 1800 are clearly visible the new buildings erected during 25 years: the municipal granaries on the river waterfront and the fish Market, established along a dirt road meandering around the ruins of the castle.

From 1834 on, a continuous frontages of houses and granaries were visible in the western part of Grodzka Street, but, since the mid-19th century, the bridge extending the street to Mill Island has been demolished, and Grodzka ends with a connection to Tadeusz Malczewski Street. The only difference between 1876's and today's layout is the extension of Grodzka Street to the east, linking to Bernardyńska street.

In the second half of the 19th century, new buildings have been erected in the street: the Seminary Building (1858), and the Lloyd's Palace (1884), both placed on the plot of the dried moat castle. The most representative buildings, now gone, were standing at the intersection with Mostowa street: the House Jachmann (1838) with its cafe Bristol onto the Brda river, and the House Fryderyk (1902) comprising a restaurant Piwnica Fryderykowska, a department store and suites, design by builder Joseph Święcicki.

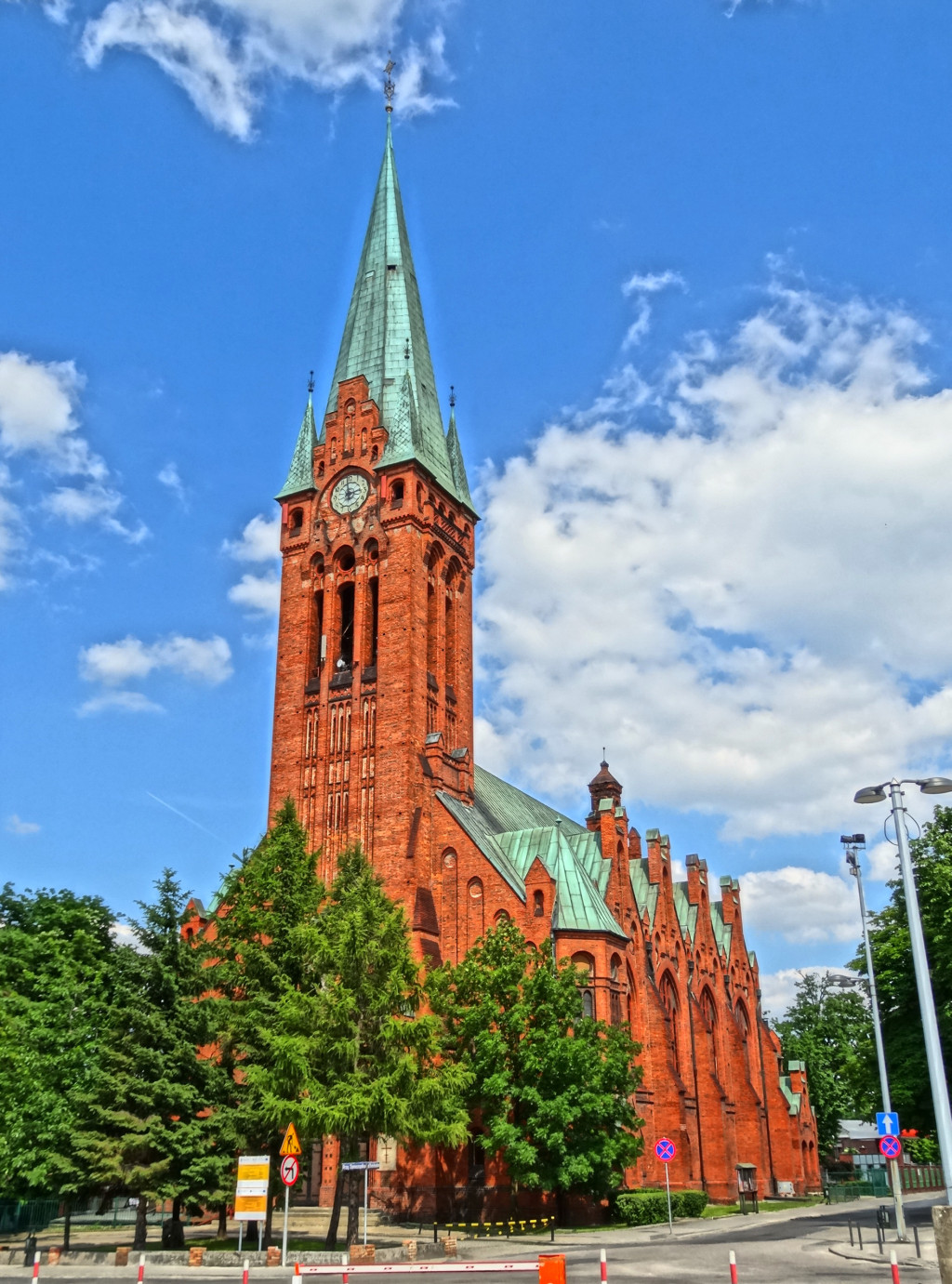
St. Andrew Bobola Church

In the early 20th century, on the site of the former castle was built an evangelical temple, which after World War II became the Jesuit's church of St. Andrew Bobola.

=== Demolitions during the Nazi occupation ===
In 1940, on Hitler's orders, the Nazi occupation authorities demolished buildings and granaries nearby Mostowa street (in particular houses Jachmann and Fryderyk).

=== Post-World War II period ===
In 1960, two half-timbered granaries located on the fish market burned down. In 1973, a square with a fountain has been built nearby Mostowa street where the houses demolished in 1940 stood. The northernmost part of Grodzka Street has been rebuilt in 2006–2007, works being completed in 2015 including: the Grodzka Street section from Mostowa St. to Podwale St. (repaved), the bridge, entirely restored, and Jatki street, between old market square and Grodzka, renovated. After 1990, new distinctive modern buildings appeared in the street including: mBank seat in Bydgoszcz, recognizable by its glass granary architecture has been erected in 1996–1998, and the three star Holiday Inn hotel, built in 2008–2010 at the eastern end of the street. The modernization of the street pavement was included in the Revitalization Plan of Bydgoszcz.

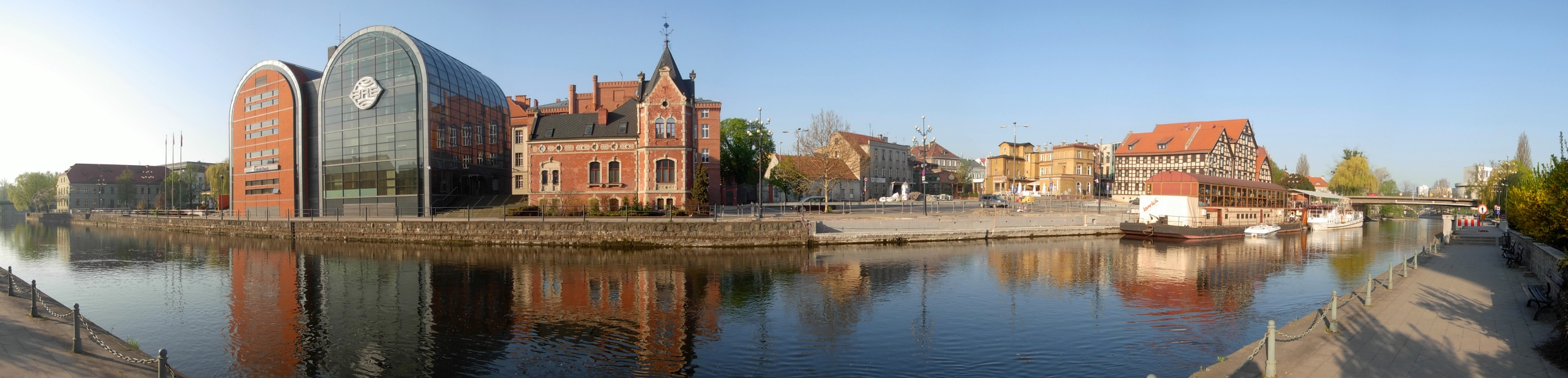
Panorama of Grodzka St. buildings from opposite Brda river bank

== Main places and buildings ==
The Culture institute – Catholic house, at 1

Registered on Kuyavian-Pomeranian Voivodeship Heritage List Nr.702040, Reg.A/1266, (January 31, 2006).

The building was constructed in 1927–1928 to accommodate the growing number of the Polish Catholic community in Bydgoszcz after the city rejoined Poland in 1920. Pastor Tadeusz Skarbek-Malczewski wanted to improve dramatically the modest original rectory housing at Focha Street 11 and thus planned to build a house designed for meetings and educational activities for Catholics in Bydgoszcz. The plot selected at Grodzka 1 was owned by the church and the architect selected was Stefan Cybichowski from Poznań, builder of many monasteries in Greater Poland and Pomerania. The construction was financed from social contributions and with the help of local authorities. The consecration of the Catholic House by Tadeusz Skarbek-Malczewski happened on March 11, 1927.

The ground floor housed a reading room and a hall room for 240 seats, while upstairs were a room hall with 60 seats and the manager apartment. The House held parish meetings, meetings with children and youth, performances of religious content by amateur theaters and youth teams, and various religious events. In December 1939, when Nazi forces took the city, collections were moved to the Municipal Museum building on Mill Island, leaving the edifice at the care of curator Kazimierz Borucki. The edifice has not been impacted by 1940s destruction of waterfront buildings nearby Mostowa street (Houses "Jachman" and "Fryderyk").

After World War II, the building has been used for meetings of Catholic associations and ministries activities. In 1964, the eastern part has been rebuilt and in 1989, a monument to Leon Barciszewski (Bydgosdzcz Mayor) has been unveiled in the nearby square – it has been moved to Długa street in 2008. In the years 1982–2000 the building housed classrooms of the Primate Institute of Christian Culture. Since the erection in 2004 of Bydgoszcz Diocese, the manager of the building is the diocesan curia. In 2007 renovations have carried out with subsidies from the city.

After granting Bydgoszcz with EU funds under the Regional Operational Programme of Kuyavian-Pomeranian Voivodeship, the edifice has been completely renovated and transformed into a "Institute of Culture – Polish House", dedicated to culture, business and society. The property houses the conference center of the diocese, and it is planned to open a Museum of the Diocese of Bydgoszcz. Official inauguration of the Polish House has happened on May 24, 2012, in the presence of Bydgoszcz bishop Jan Tyrawa and Bydgoszcz Mayor Rafał Bruski

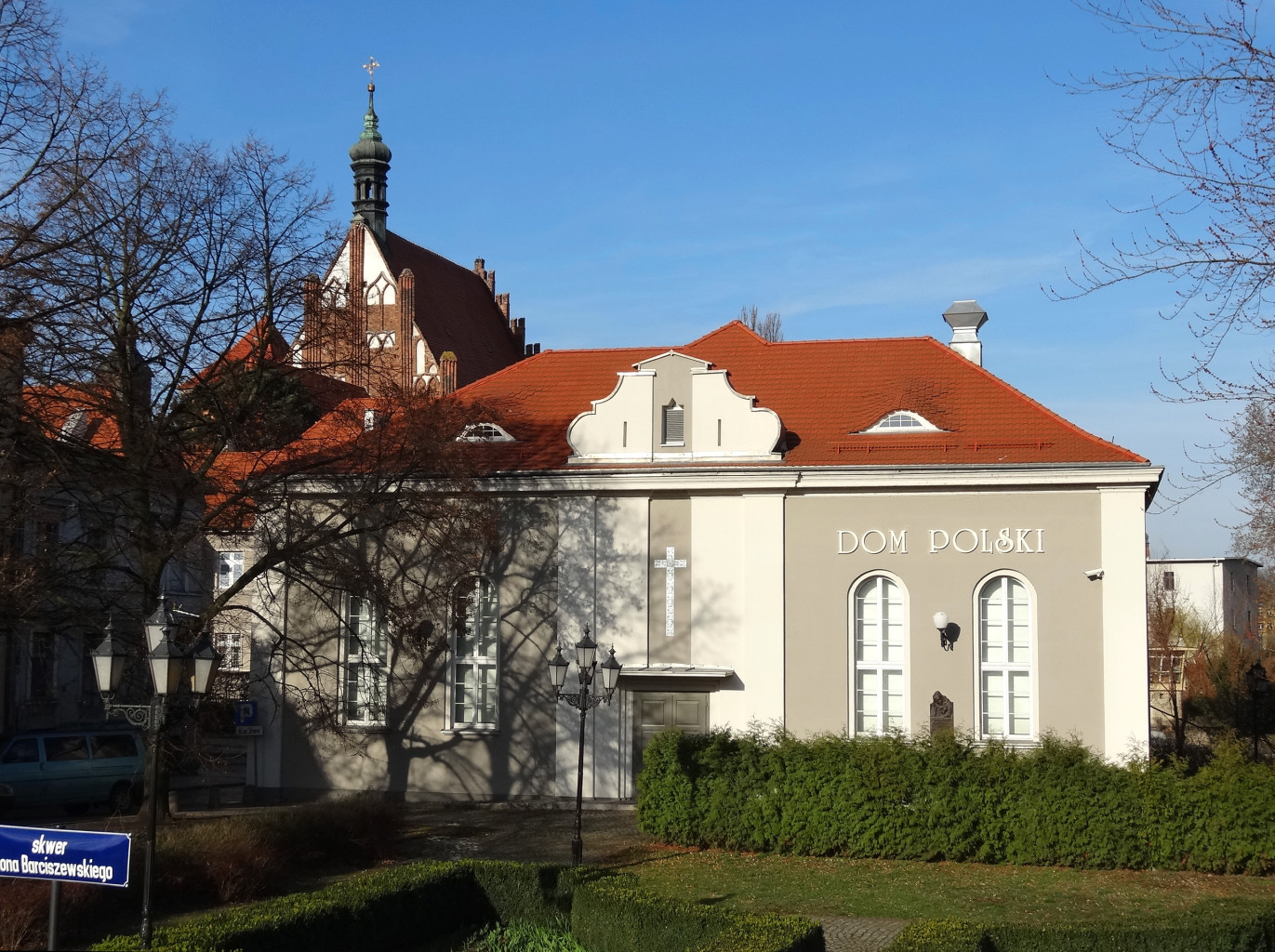
Main facade

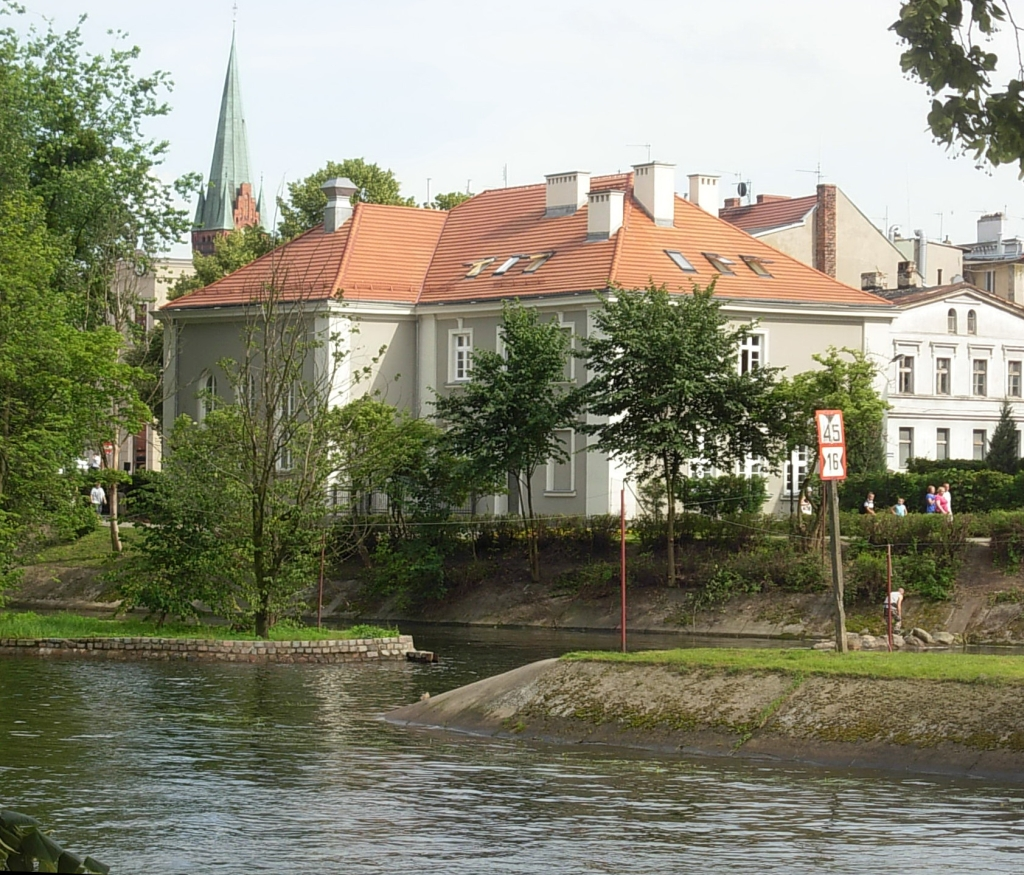
View from across the Brda river

Building at 7 Mostowa street, corner with Grodzka Street,

1850–1900

Eclecticism.

This tenement has been recently renovated.

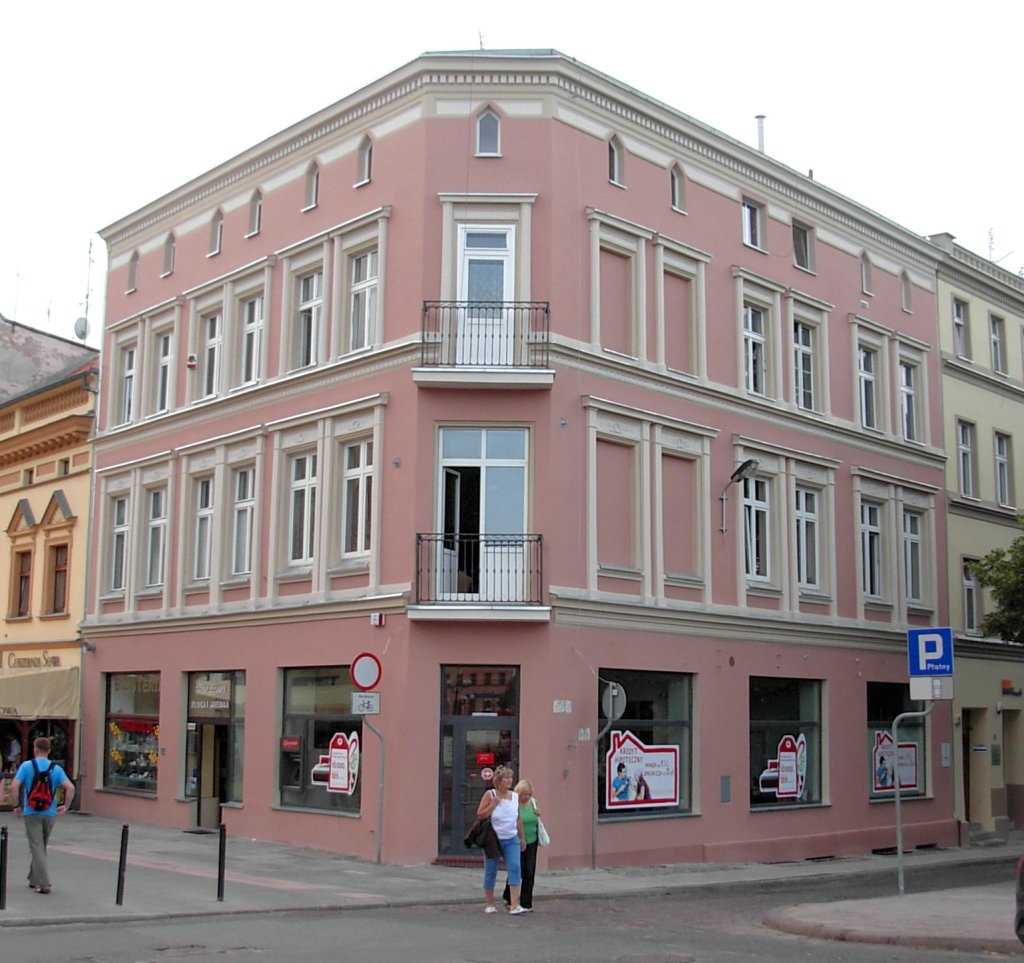
Building on Grodzka 6 Street at Mostowa

Dutch Granary, at 7

Registered on Kuyavian-Pomeranian Voivodeship Heritage List, Nr.601338, Reg.A/1122, (January 25, 1960 & May 12, 1993. 1794–1797: Wattle and daub.

This granary has been built before 1793. It is a one-storey structure with a round-gable roof style which gave its name "Dutch granary". After a thorough renovation of the Dutch granary carried out from 1993 to 2002, municipal authorities have dedicated it for the Regional Museum Leon Wyczółkowski. Since April 2002, it houses the Museum of Bydgoszcz, featuring a permanent exhibition about the history of the city, as well as a Tourist Information point.

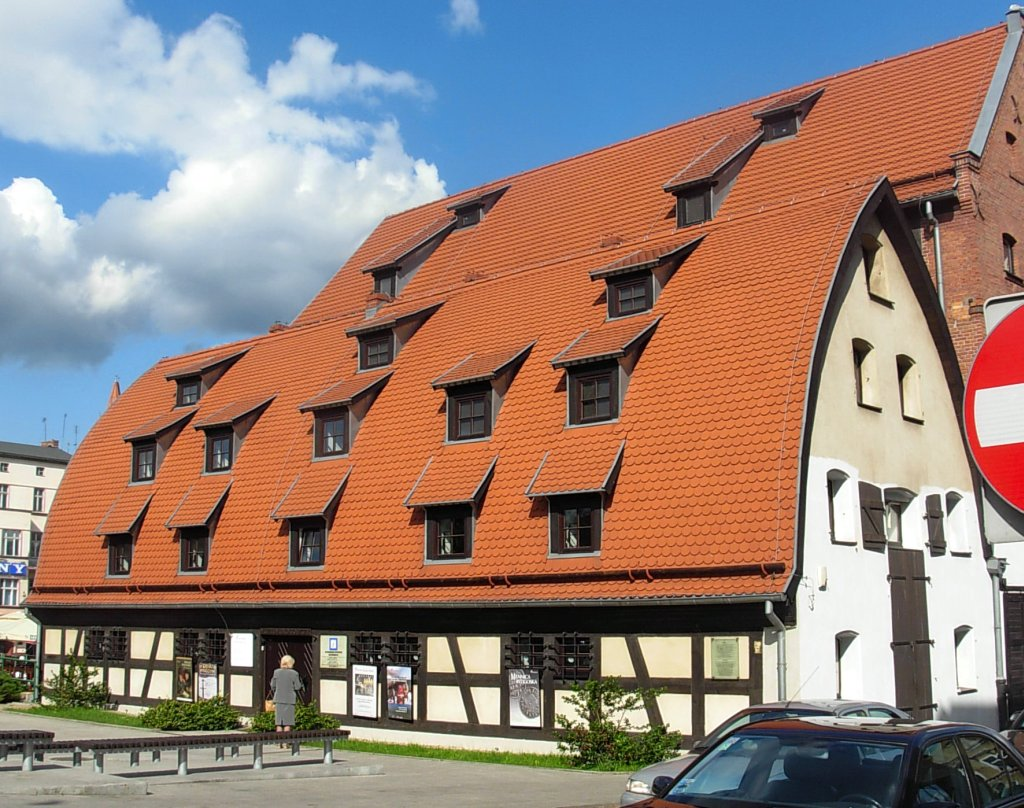
Dutch Granary at Grodzka 7 Street

Building at Nr.8, corner with Mostowa street.

Neo-Eclecticism.

This edifice tenement has been built in 2007 following the Eclecticist style, by local Polish patisserie company "Cukiernia Sowa". It houses now one of its restaurants.

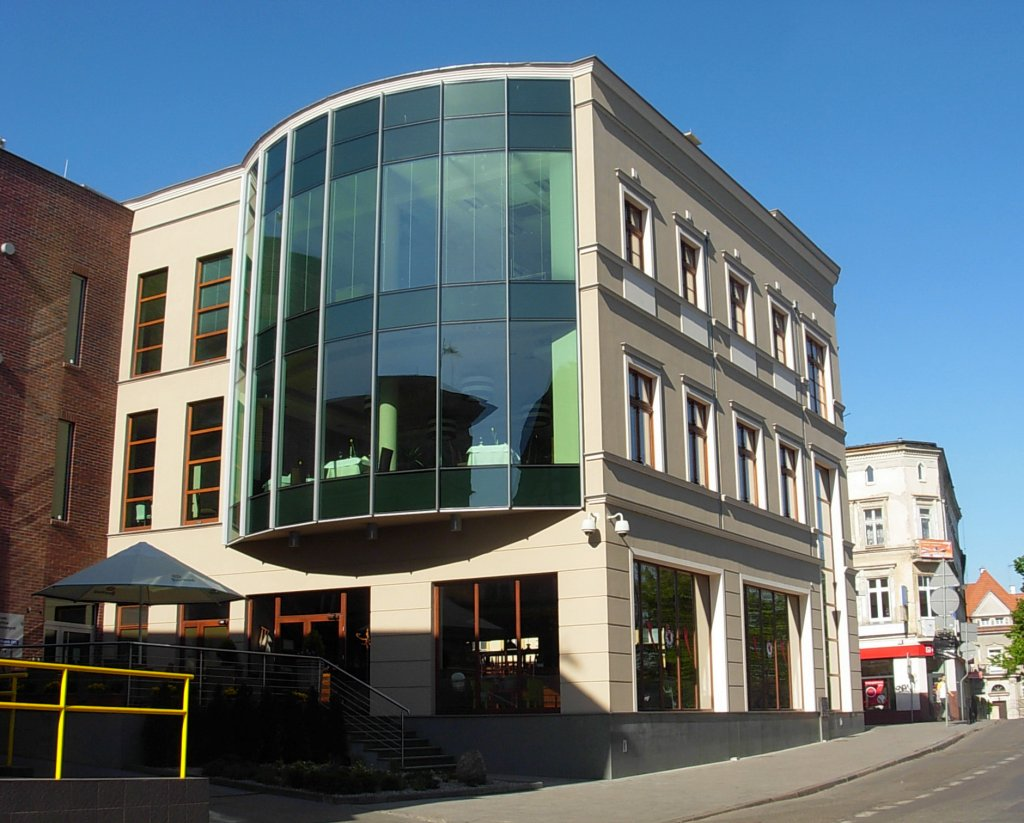
Renovated building at Grodzka 8 Street

Grain Granaries, at 9/11.

Registered on Kuyavian-Pomeranian Voivodeship Heritage List, Nr.601339 & 601340, Reg.A/1123 & A/1124, (May 12, 1993).

1793–1800: Wattle and daub.

These buildings have been built by Samuel Gotlieb Engelmann, a merchant, as a complex of five granaries, and worked for over 150 years. In February 1960, a great fire destroyed two other adjacent granaries close to the Fish Market (at Nr.13 and 15). From this date on, the municipal authorities have re-allocated granaries for the needs of the Regional Museum "Leon Wyczółkowski". Between 1998 and 2006, a general overhaul have been carried out.

These are half-timbered buildings, characterized by their wooden frame filled with bricks and their de l'Orme roof. The four-storey granary at Grodzka 9 has been rebuilt in the third quarter of the 19th century. The granary at Grodzka 11 has only three storey.

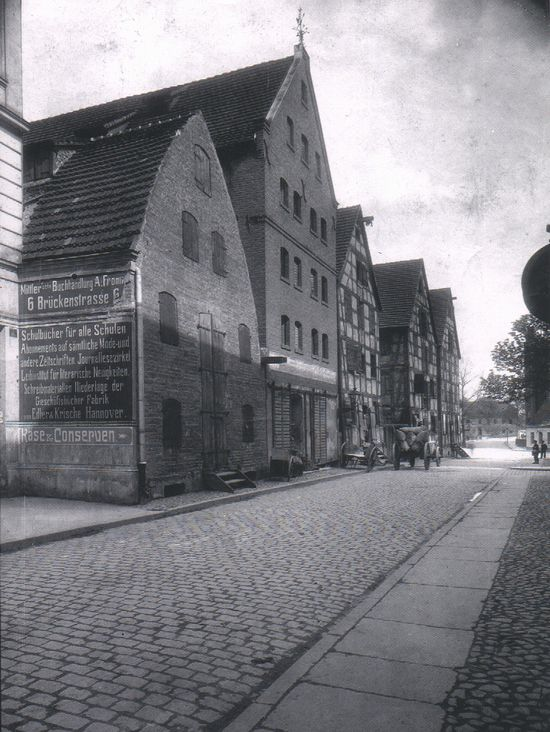
View of the 5 Granaries in 1905

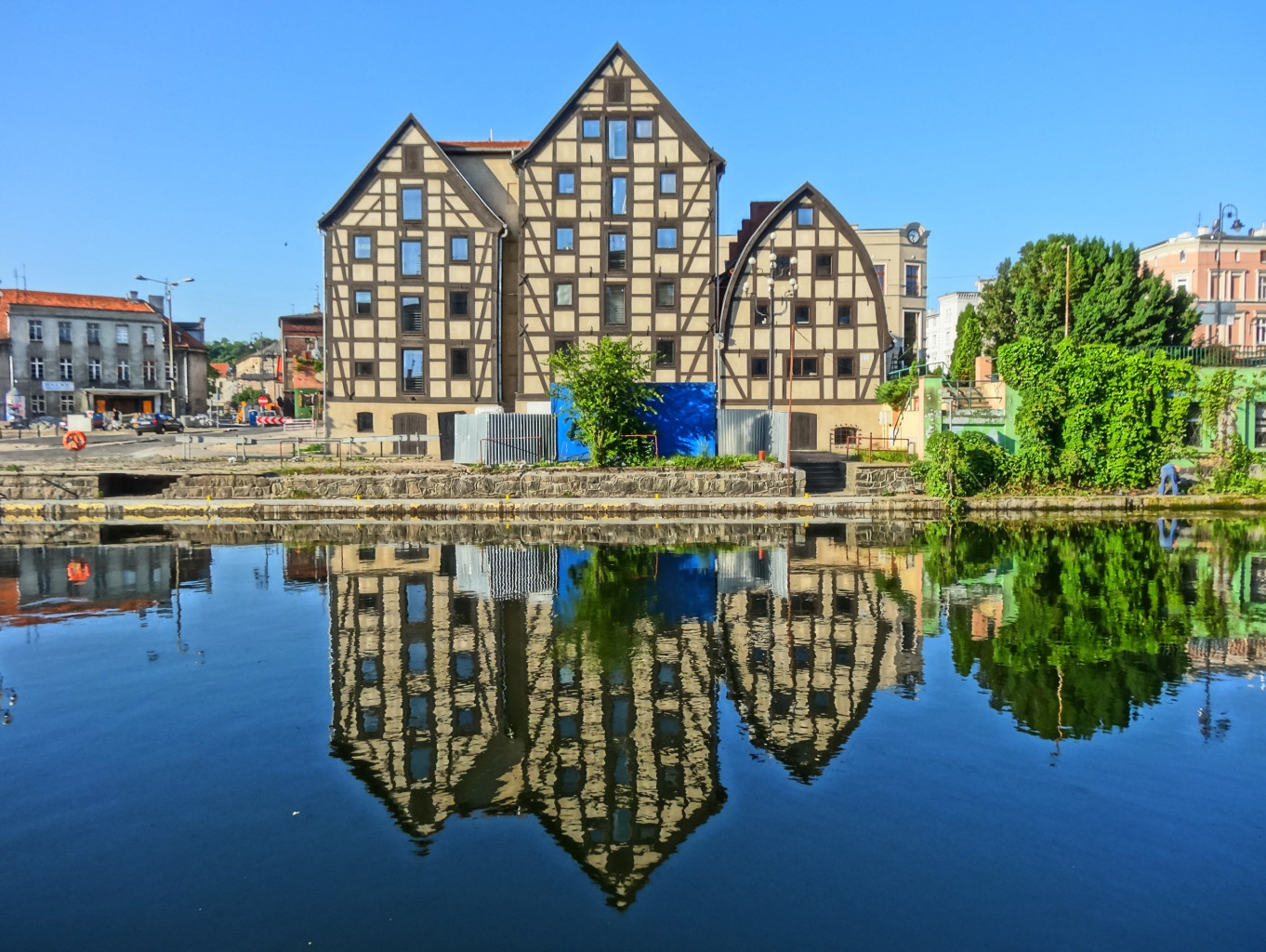
View of the 3 granaries

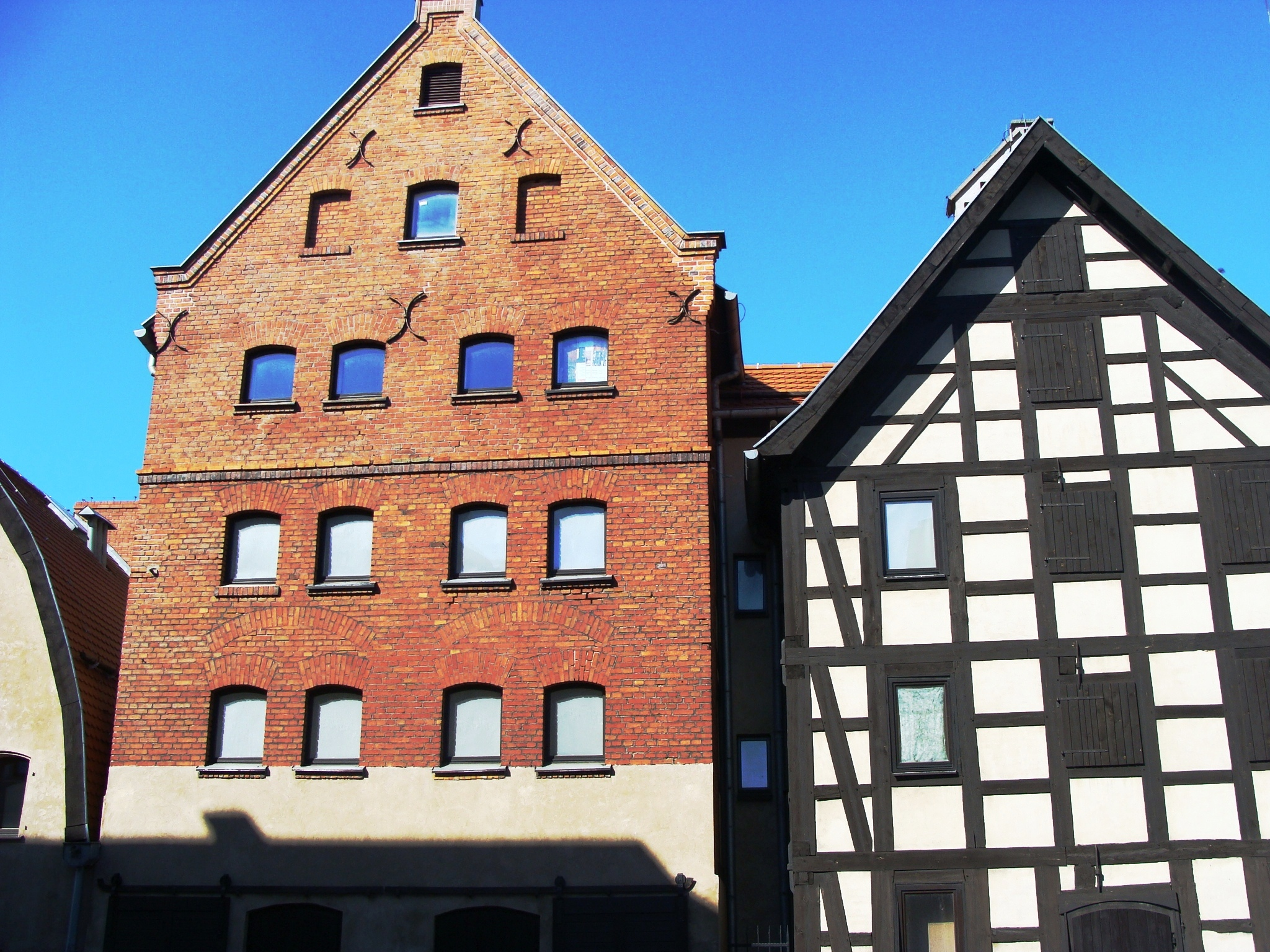
View from Grodzka Street

Building at 12

Eclecticism

First quarter of the 19th century

This tenement housed a German restaurant "Alt Bromberg", called then "Stara Bydgoszcz" during interwar period. The building has been purchased by local entrepreneur Adam Sowa to be a piece of a new hotel ensemble to open in 2019. For this purpose, the edifice at Nr.12 has been thoroughly restored

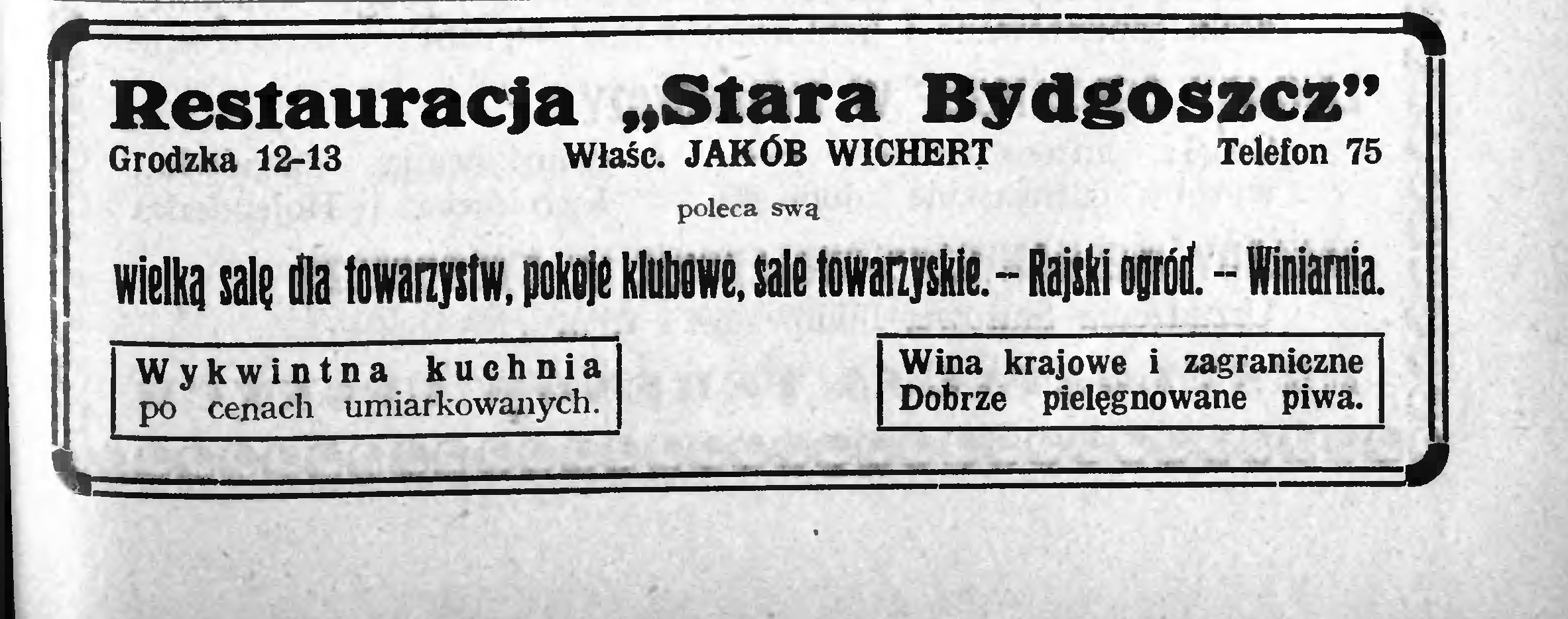
Advertising for restaurant "Stara Bydgoszcz" ca 1926

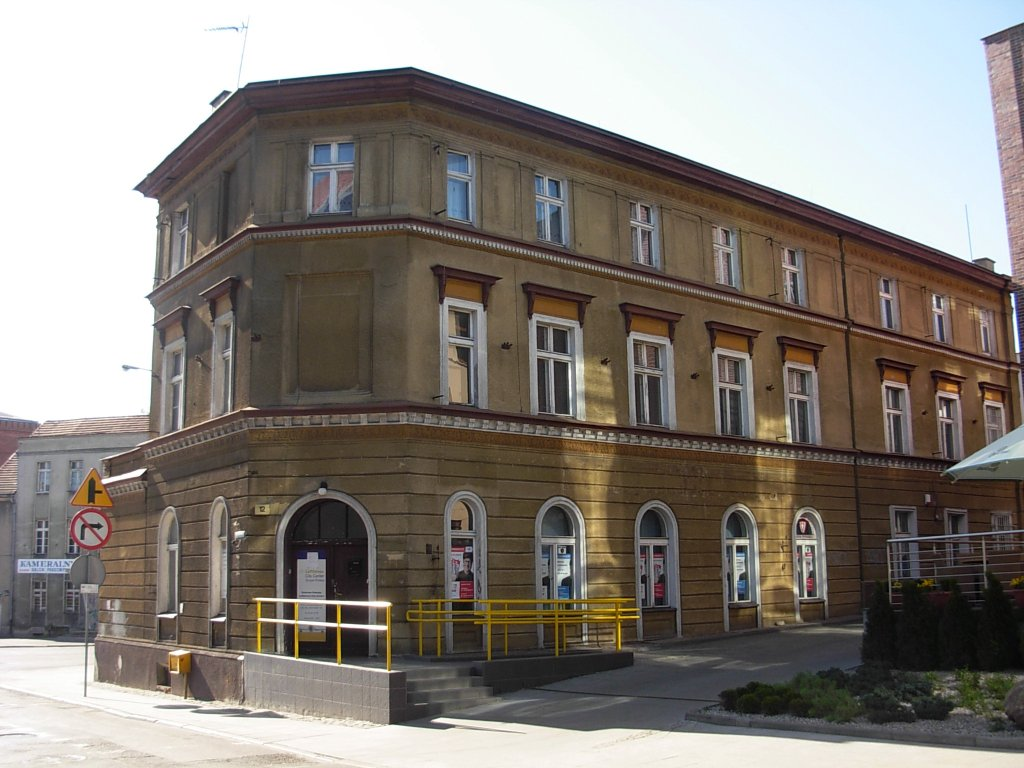
View of the frontage onto Jatki street

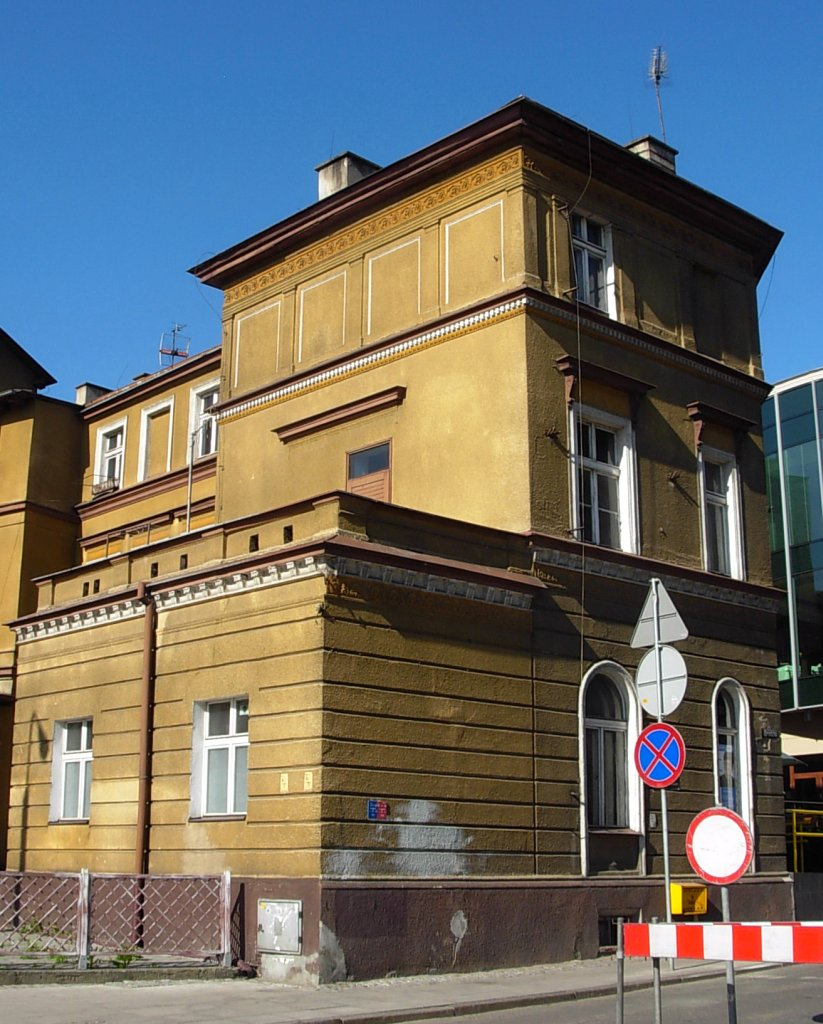
Eastern frontage

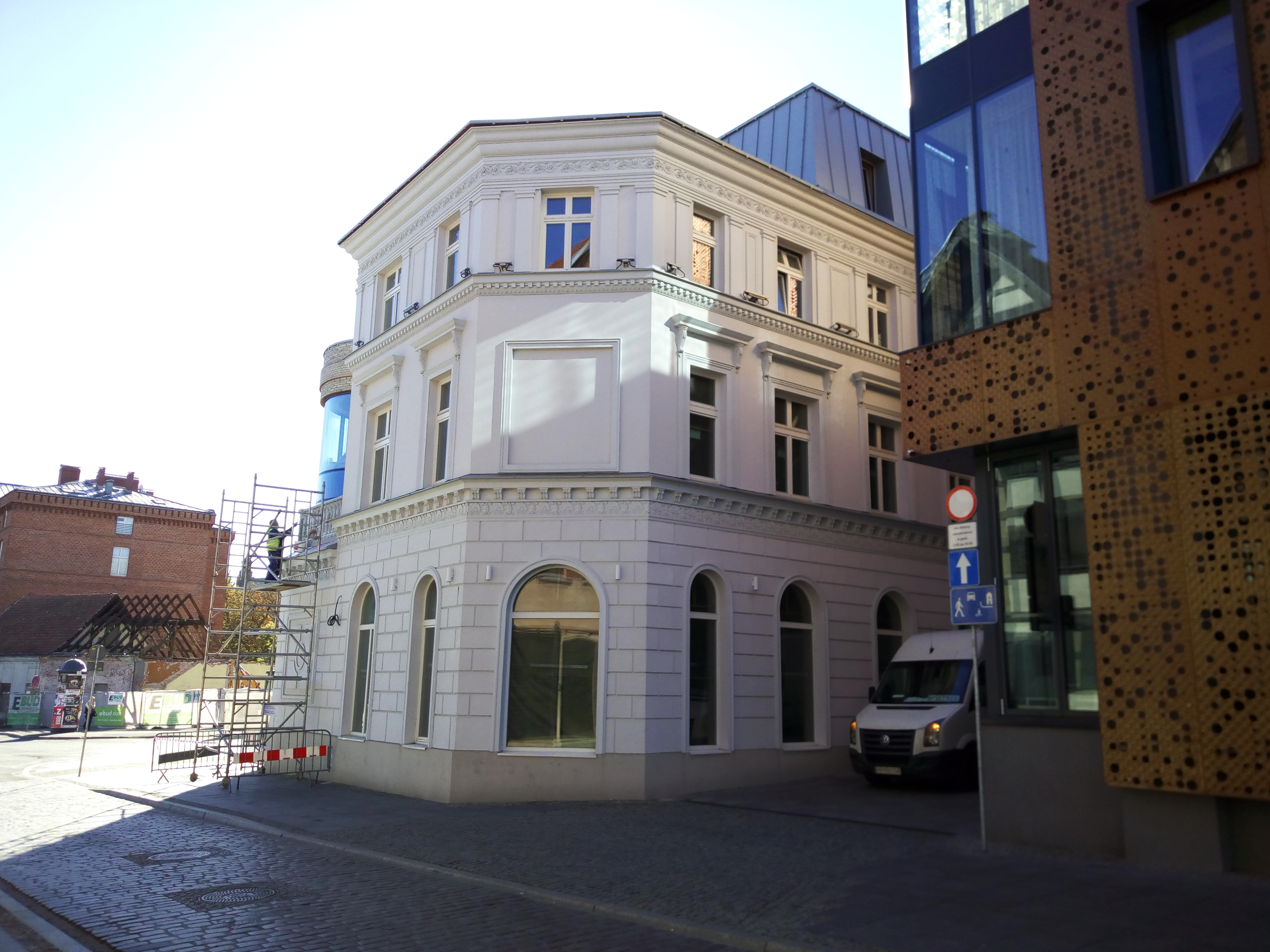
Building renovated in mid-2018

Bydgoszcz Chamber theatre at 14/16

Registered on Kuyavian-Pomeranian Voivodeship Heritage List, Nr.601341, Reg.A/887 (June 21, 1993).

The chamber theatre, built in 1875–1876 and rebuilt in 1897 by Karl Bergner in the style of Eclecticism, has initially housed a restaurant with a bowling alley and a garden, one of the several dining and entertainment complexes operating in Bromberg at this time. The facility gained popularity after its acquisition by Jacob Wichert, who expanded it. In 1897, architect Karl Bergner designed a banquet hall for 600 people, with Neo-Baroque and Eclecticism designs. Karl Bergner was famous for its realizations in several buildings of Bromberg, like Max Zweininger house or House at Focha Street 4. Interiors were lavishly decorated, the complex after expansion comprised a wine bar, a beer-house, a summer garden, a restaurant "Stara Bydgoszcz" ("Old Bydgoszcz"), and in the main hall were held numerous balls, concerts, theatre performances, and cabaret shows. The activity went on until the end of World War II.

In 1947–1949, the place has been adapted for theatrical stage performances, in replacement of the demolished Municipal Theatre, and after a 1945–1947 period where performances were held at Gdanska St.66–68. Theatrical activity was then using a small stage set up in the banquet hall. After completion in October 1949 of the Polish Theatre in Bydgoszcz, performances left Grodzka Street.

After 1956 Gomułka's thaw, the Polish Theatre in Adam Mickiewicz Alley turned to more spontaneous performances and began to look for other premises: attention was then drawn to an abandoned building at Grodzka Street 14–16, and a second theater scene started there. A thorough overhaul of the edifice was then carried out by artist Stanislaw Lejkowski, both outside and inside, with a 300 seats hall, a foyer and breakfast area. The new facility was called Chamber Theatre. Its program included plays from Jan Potocki, Henry Becque, Keith Waterhouse, Oscar Wilde, Jerzy Jurandot, Alfred Hennequin and many more.

Chamber theatre scene was the place for experiments of new, high-profile and avant-garde plays adapting literary Polish and foreign works. In the 1960s, 1970s and 1980s more than 130 plays from a diversified repertoire were put on stage. In 1988, unable to meet fire regulations, the building lost its activity which has moved to the Polish Theatre in Bydgoszcz. An entire re-building of the facility happened scheduled in 2020–2021. The new theatre features, among others, a multifunction amphitheatre with 187 seats, workshop and meetings rooms, so as to support artistic and social development.

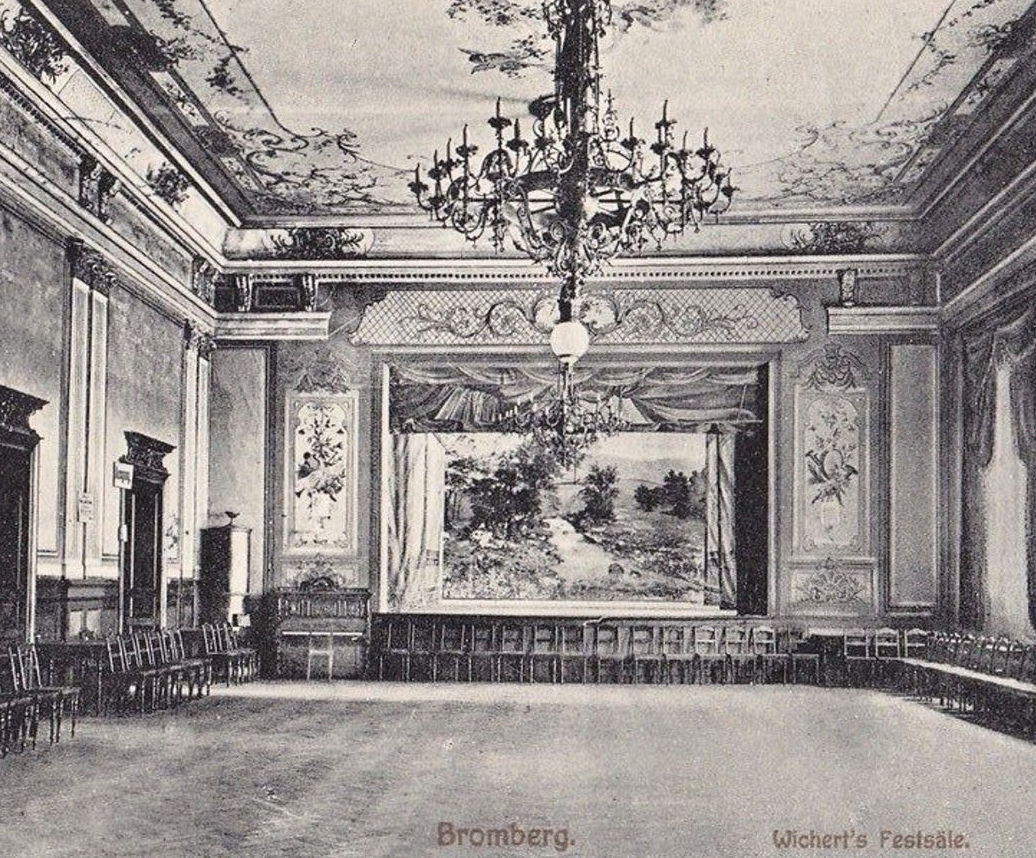
Main hall in 1910

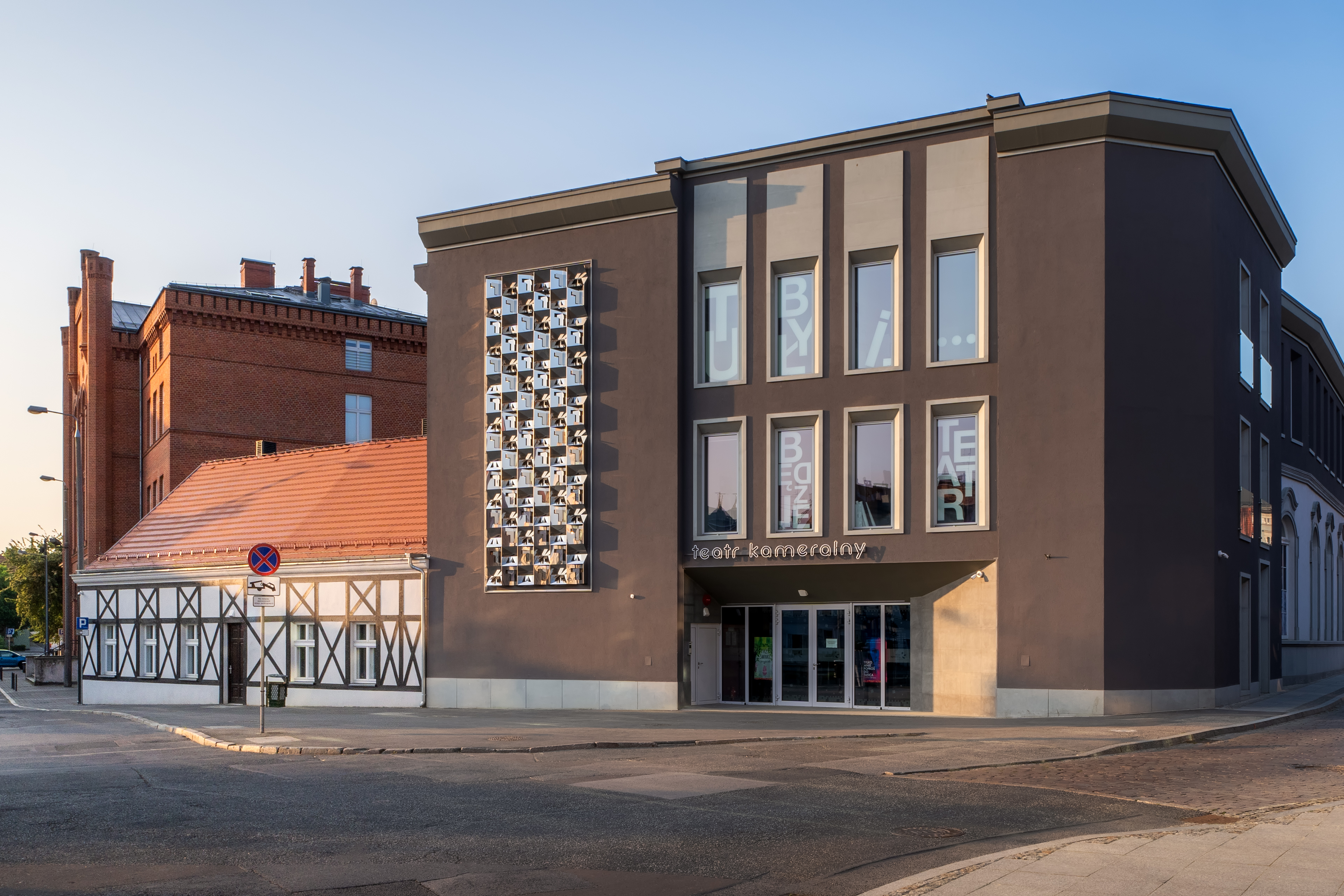
Renovated building viewed from the Brda river

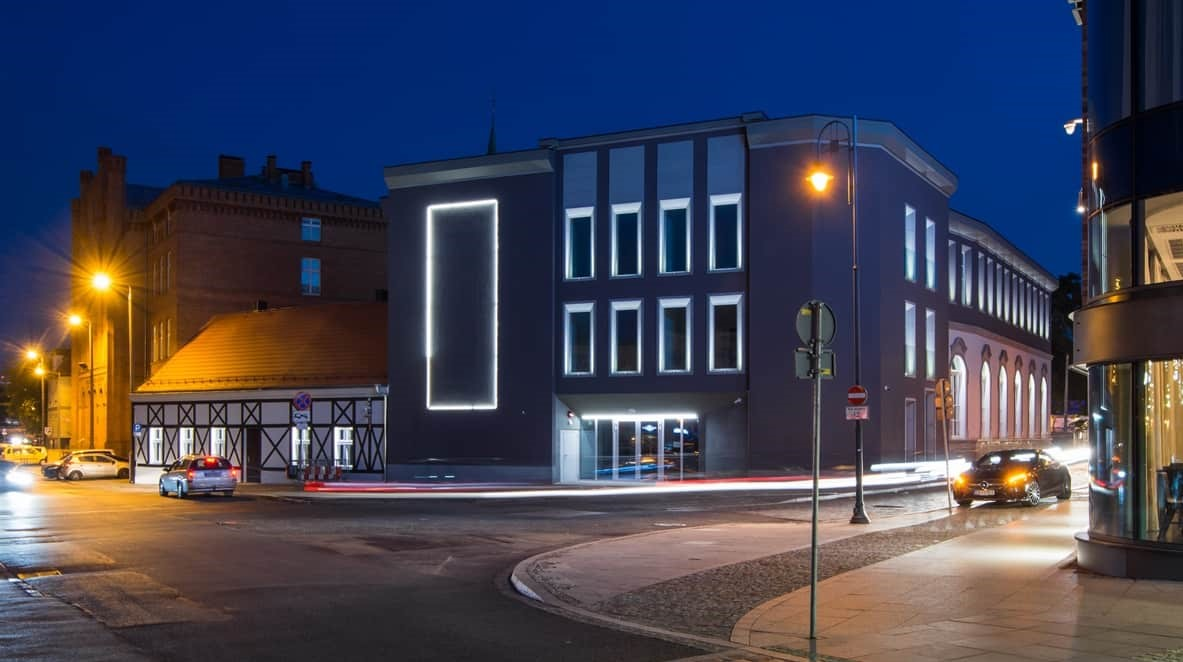
By Night

Fish Market is located between Grodzka Street and Brda river waterfront in the Old Town. On opposite Brda river bank is located the neo-Gothic main Post Office building. A water tram stop is located at Fish Market. Fish Market was set in the Middle Ages, and worked till 1946. It was the traditional place for trading fish, directly on galleys and boats, and then on barges and steamers.

In the 19th century, it was a central place for business, and in neighboring granaries were stored fish and herring transiting from Gdańsk using Brda waterway. Permanent market stalls were open from dawn to dusk. In 1906, fish trading was transferred to the municipal market hall in Podwale Street, but the fish market still sold salted herring in barrels and pottery.

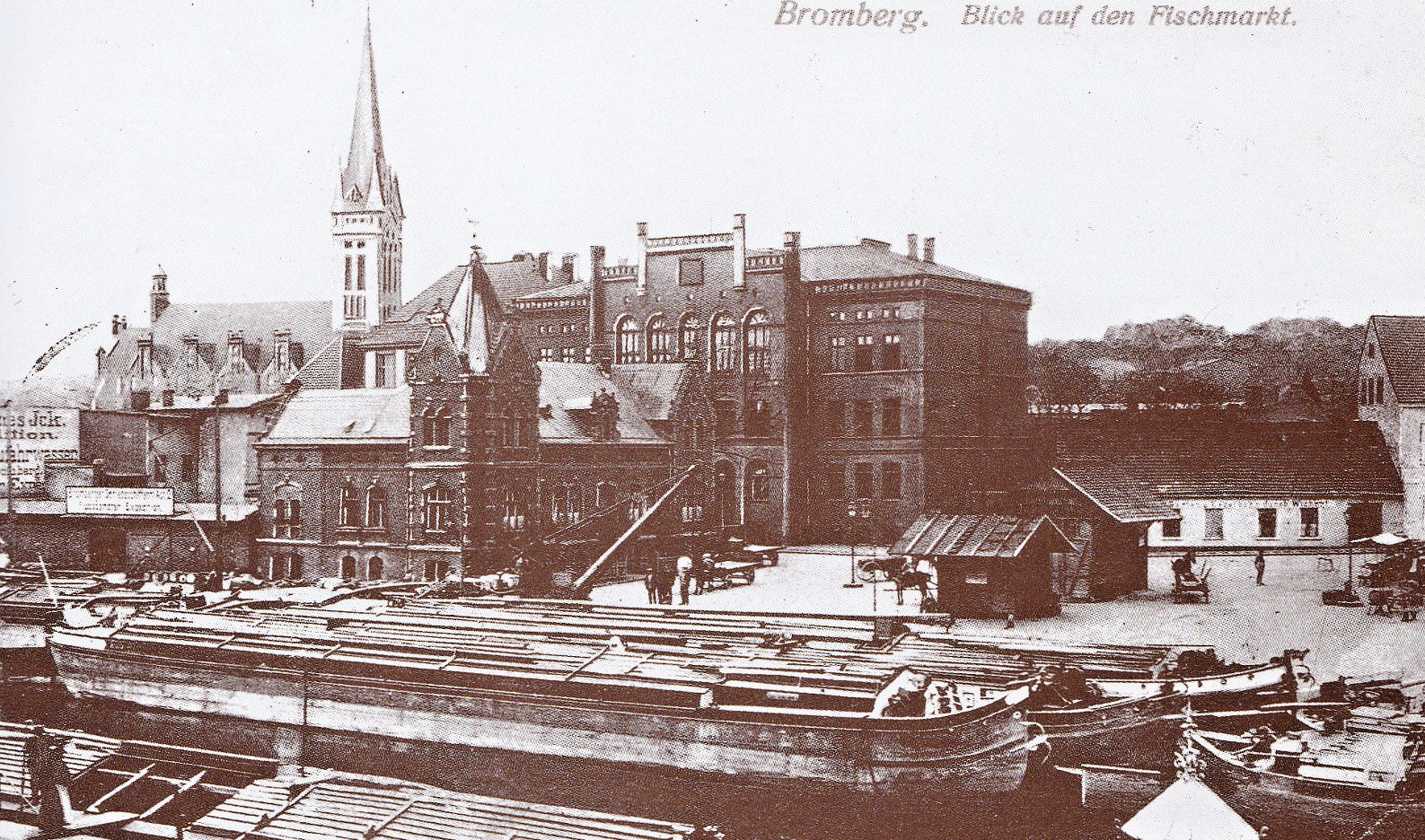
View ca 1916

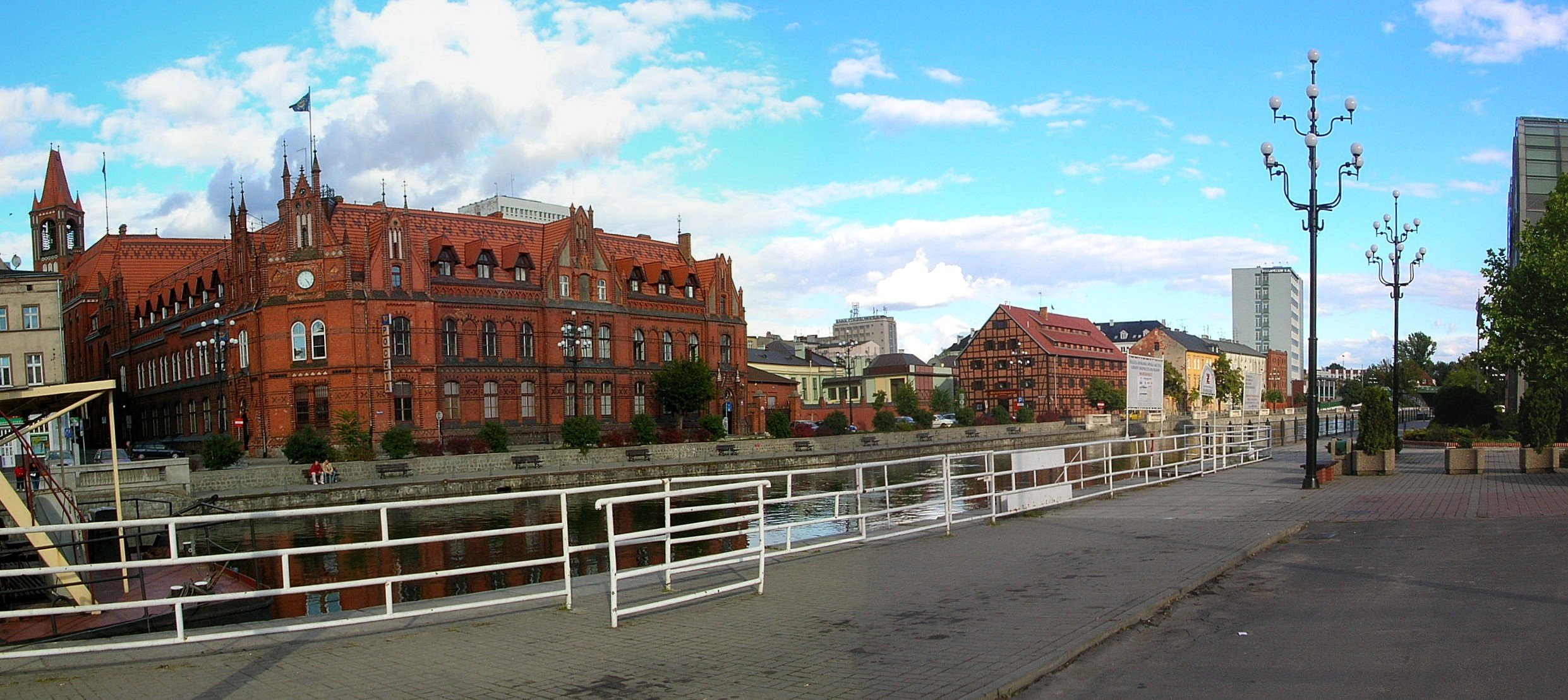
Main post office frontage viewed from fish market

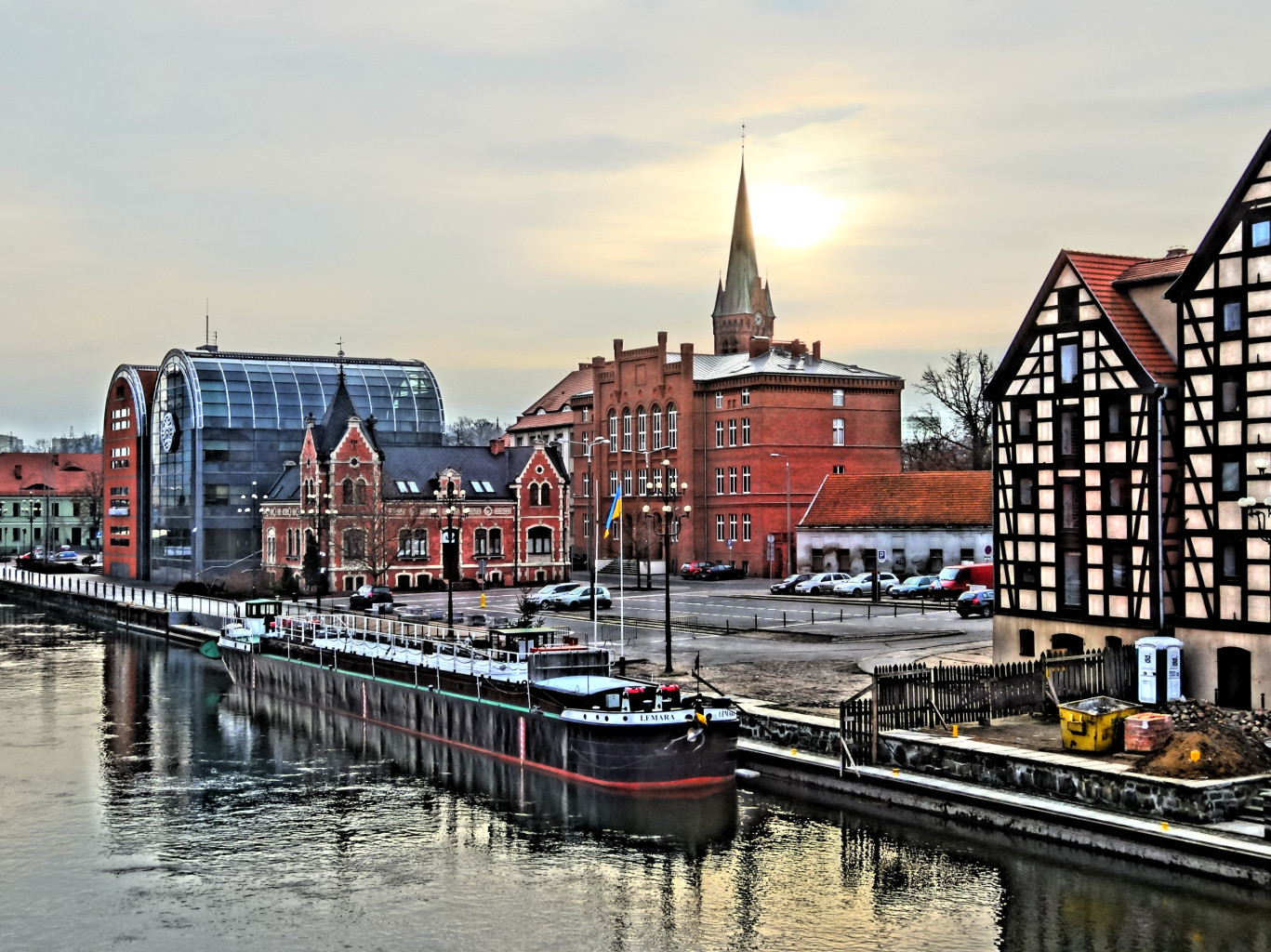
View from the bridge over Brda river

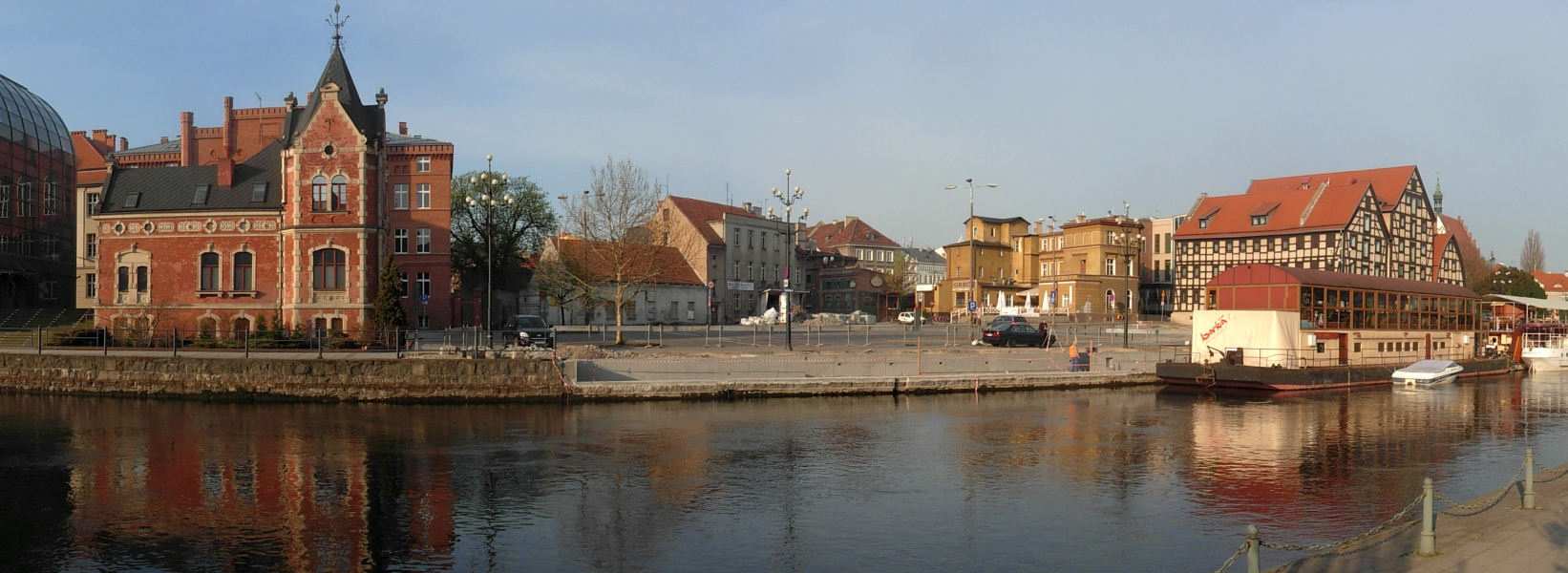
View from opposite side of Brda river

Lloyd Palace, at 17

Registered on Kuyavian-Pomeranian Voivodeship Heritage List: Nr.601342, Reg.A/1125 (October 12, 1995).

Built in the style of Dutch Mannerism in 1885–1886, it was commissioned by Otto Liedtke. He was the co-founder with Heinrich Dietz, in 1873, of one of the major shipping companies in East-Prussia, Lloyd, with local branch in Königsberg, Elbing and Dantzig. It was the most representative building of an entire complex, including among others, a house, a coach house and storage rooms. The designer was master builder Waldemar Jenisch, gave the building its Mannerism style. At the turn of the 20th century, the Lloyd of Bydgoszcz operated about 3000 rafters on the Bydgoszcz Canal. Until 1908, the palace has served as living quarters for the owner and his family. Later, when the property was sold to Inland Waterways shipping company "Bromberger Schleppschifffahrt Aktien Gesellschaft", a reconstruction of the building was carried out to fit it for administration and office purposes.

In 1920, when Bydgoszcz rejoined the Polish territory, the German shipping company was renamed "Lloyd Bydgoszcz" and his seat remained in the adorned palace. "Lloyd" company was then one of the largest shipping companies in the country. Its network included: the Regional branches in Gdańsk, Warsaw, Włocławek; a brick factory, a saw mill and a distillery in Bydgoszcz area; as well as shipyard on Brda river, and a trans-shipment port in Bydgoszcz vicinity.

After World War II, the building was still owned by the shipping company, which took the name of "Żegluga Bydgoska" (Bydgoszcz Inland Waterways Shipping company). The basement housed the archives, storage rooms and a boiler room. On the ground floor were directors office, accounting and numerous departments of the company. In the attic were another office and the telephone exchange. In 1974, the edifice has been renovated: inside the palace a Mariner House was built and the other buildings demolished to give place to the waterfront facility (which was not built due to economic difficulties).

The property was sold in 1995 to BRE Bank, which realized a thorough renovation of the palace, with reconstruction of architectural details (cornices, pediments, pinnacles, obelisks, spire with weather vane). At the very place of the old ancillary facilities, BRE Bank has ordered in 1997–1998 to architect Andrzej Bulanda two modern glass-steel-and-clinker-brick buildings, known as "new granaries".

The Lloyd palace, with its Dutch Mannerism style, presents similarities with two other buildings in Bydgoszcz: the building at 9 Kołłątaja Street (former shelter for blind people) and the Eastern Railway Headquarters building at 63 Dworcowa Street.

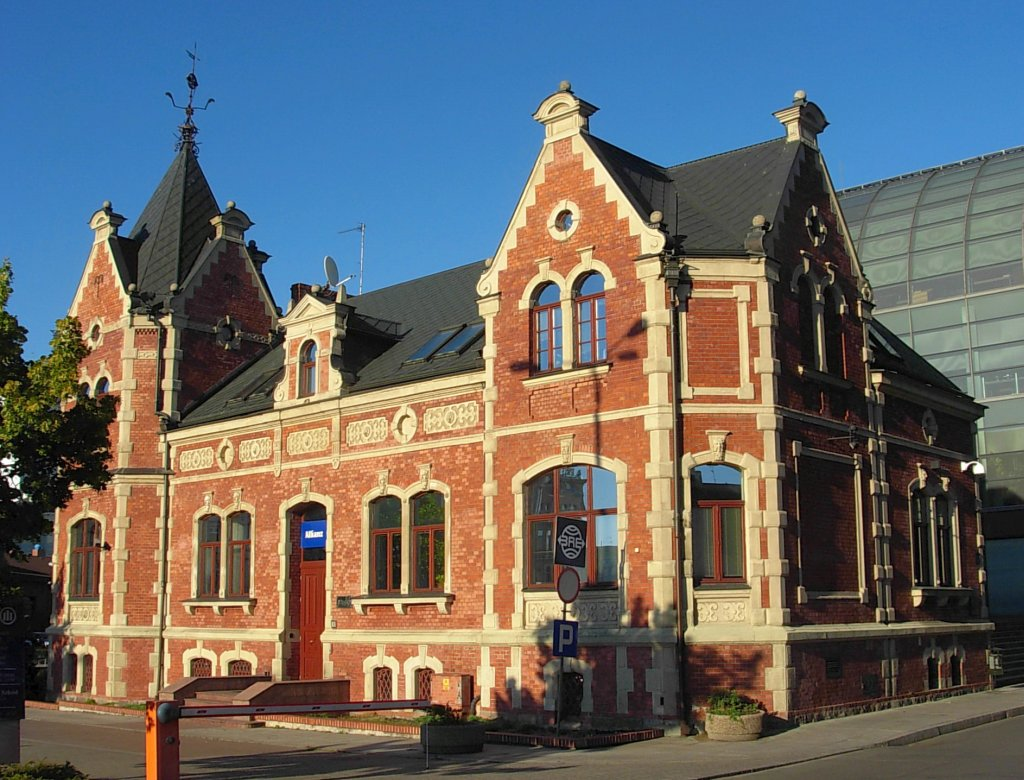
View from Grodzka Street

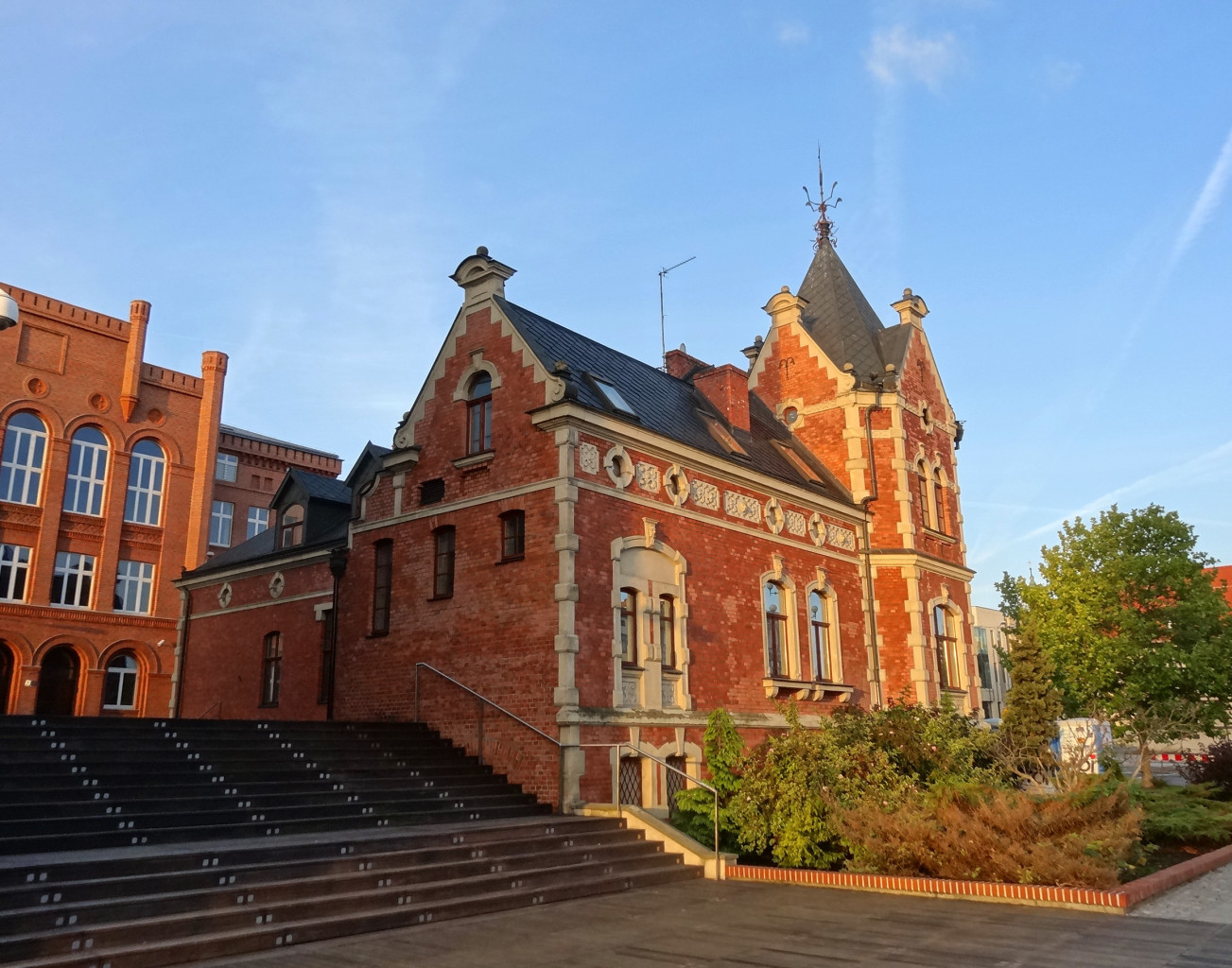
View from the Brda river

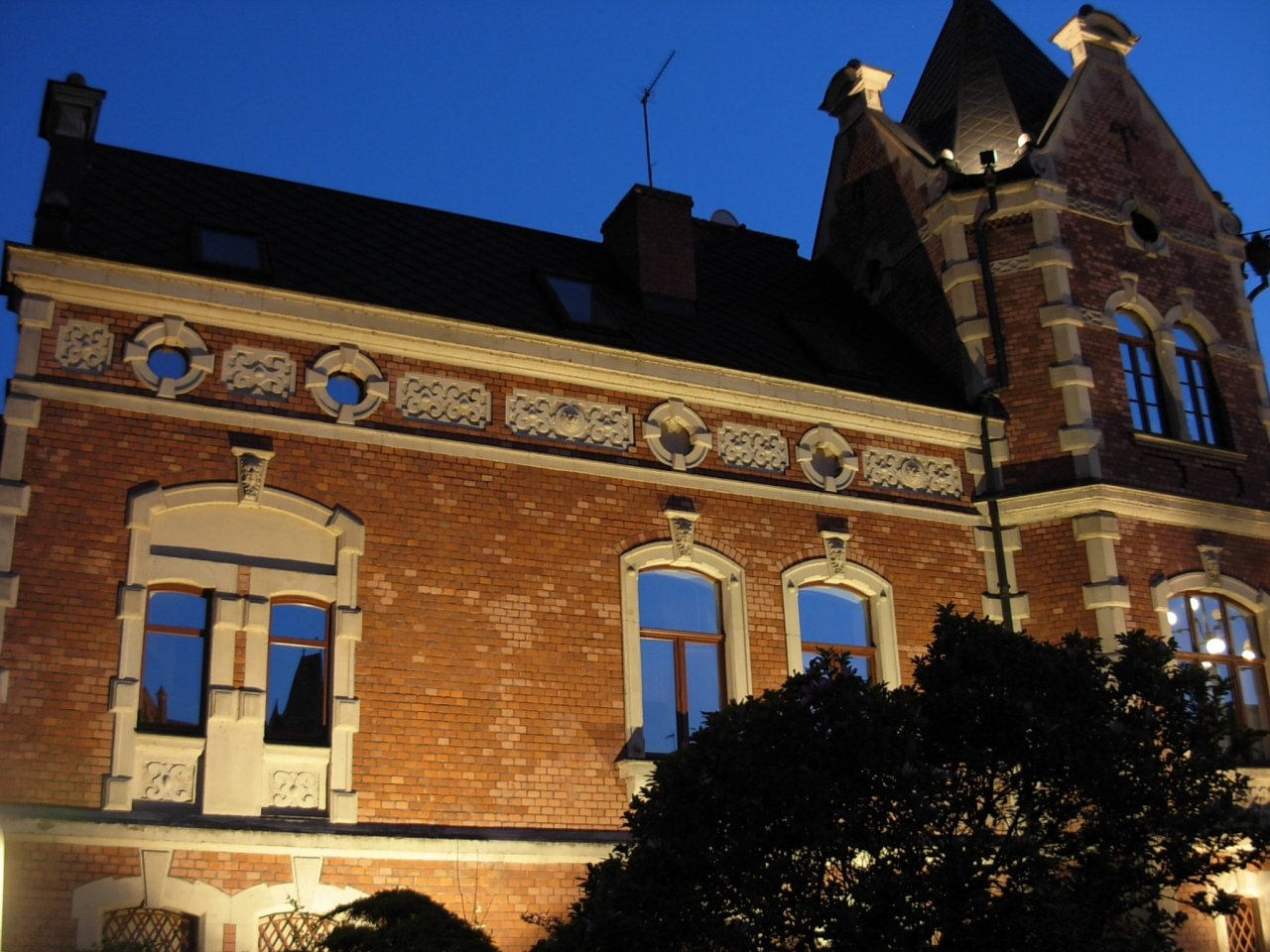
Frontage by night

High Seminary of Bydgoszcz Diocese, at 18

Registered on Kuyavian-Pomeranian Voivodeship Heritage List: Nr.601343, Reg.A/810 (September 30, 1992)

Erected in 1858 in the style of neo-Gothic, the red brick-laid part of the current building has been built on the very site of the former moat castle which in ruins in the 18th century, in the building of the former Carmelite monastery. The building was erected as a Realschule, established May 23, 1851, as a school of higher rank, accepting children of officials and officers. Initially, school classes were held in rented buildings at the crossing of Długa and Poznanska streets. By the 1853 spring, the school started all six grades of elementary school, and it promoted its first graduates on March 30, 1855.

The new building located at Grodzka Street has been opened on October 11, 1858. The Stadtische Realschule operated in this building till the end of the Prussian occupation in 1920.

The school was managed by the city which kept up relatively high tuition fees. In 1859, after the introduction of new regulations for royal schools, Bromberg "realschule" became a real school degree, under the supervision of the Provincial College School in Poznań. A special tribute to the school was put by foundation funds established on June 4, 1869, by a Bydgoszcz mayor, Karl von foller. With foundation's support, poorer students could attend the realschule. The school was equipped with: the teaching library, lending books to students who could not afford to purchase them, the (well-equipped) physics and chemistry offices and laboratories as well as the collection of zoological and botanical preparations, various anatomical models and a collection of fossils and minerals.

The first headmaster (1851–1886) was Gustav Gerber. In 1876, on the 25th anniversary of the school, he was promoted to the dignity of Bydgoszcz Honorary Citizen. In 1890, the school has been taken over by the Prussian State as a "Royal Grammar School". In the years 1906–1908 a two-storey block building was added to the east. It delimited the corner of the newly laid Przy Zamczysku street that followed the Old Castle demarcation.

From 1918 to 1939, the building has housed the "State High School of Humanities", one of the three state-owned middle schools for boys in the city, one of the other being the High School Nr.1. To the difference of High School Nr.1 on Plac Wolnosci which focused on classical languages courses (Greek and Latin, Humanities school emphasized studies of science (Mathematics and Physics) and French. In 1925–1926, the National Humanities High School had up to 600 students. The specificity of this school was its national and religious tolerance: among the students were Poles, Jews and even Germans, so various religious instructions were provided (Roman Catholic and Evangelical and Jewish). In 1937, the school received the patron name of marshal Edward Rydz-Śmigły. From 1938, its official full name was: Second State High School and Gymnasium "Marshal Edward Rydz-Śmigły".

After the end of World War II, the building has housed several schools. In the 1950s and 1960s there were: the general education elementary, the Middle School and High School Maria Sklodowska-Curie, as well as a vocational school of technical and metal construction. In 1968, the edifice has been transferred to the High School of Engineering, founded in 1951. In 1974 the Higher School of Engineering merged with the local branch of the University of Life Sciences in Poznań and changed its name to University of Technology and Agriculture, and 2006 to Jan & Jędrzej Śniadecki University of Technology and Life Sciences. In 1992, departments of the university started to move from the historical building at Grodzka Street to a new facility in Fordon district. All departments completed the movement in 2007. The same year, the High Seminary of Bydgoszcz Diocese Michał Kozal set up in 2004, moved into the building: this seminary is a local section of Poznań's Theology Department of Adam Mickiewicz University. This faculty gives courses on Pastoral theology, with specialization in Holy orders.

The brick-laid building makes reference to the neo-Gothic style, then the Prussian official style: it has been plastered later following Neo-Baroque references. The old edifice is symmetrical, with two avant-corps along its axis, with a low-hip roof. On the avant-corps front, the basement door openings are in the form of a triple arcade. The avant-corps onto Grodzka Street is topped with an attic style parapet and pinnacles. The recent building has a pseudo-tented roofed turret in a corner. In the years 2006– 2008, the whole building has been refurbished.

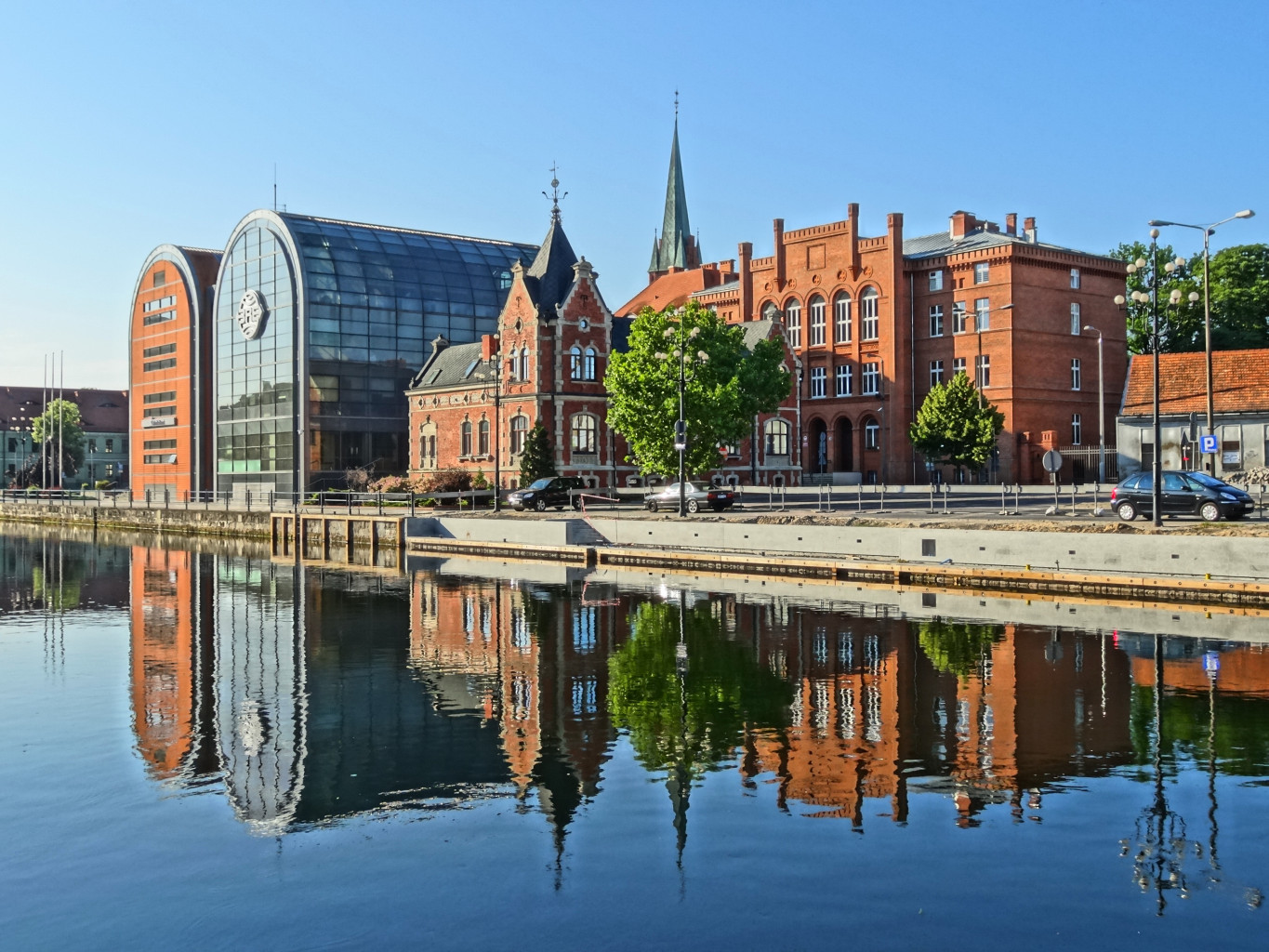
The building with Lloyd palace and the "new granaries"

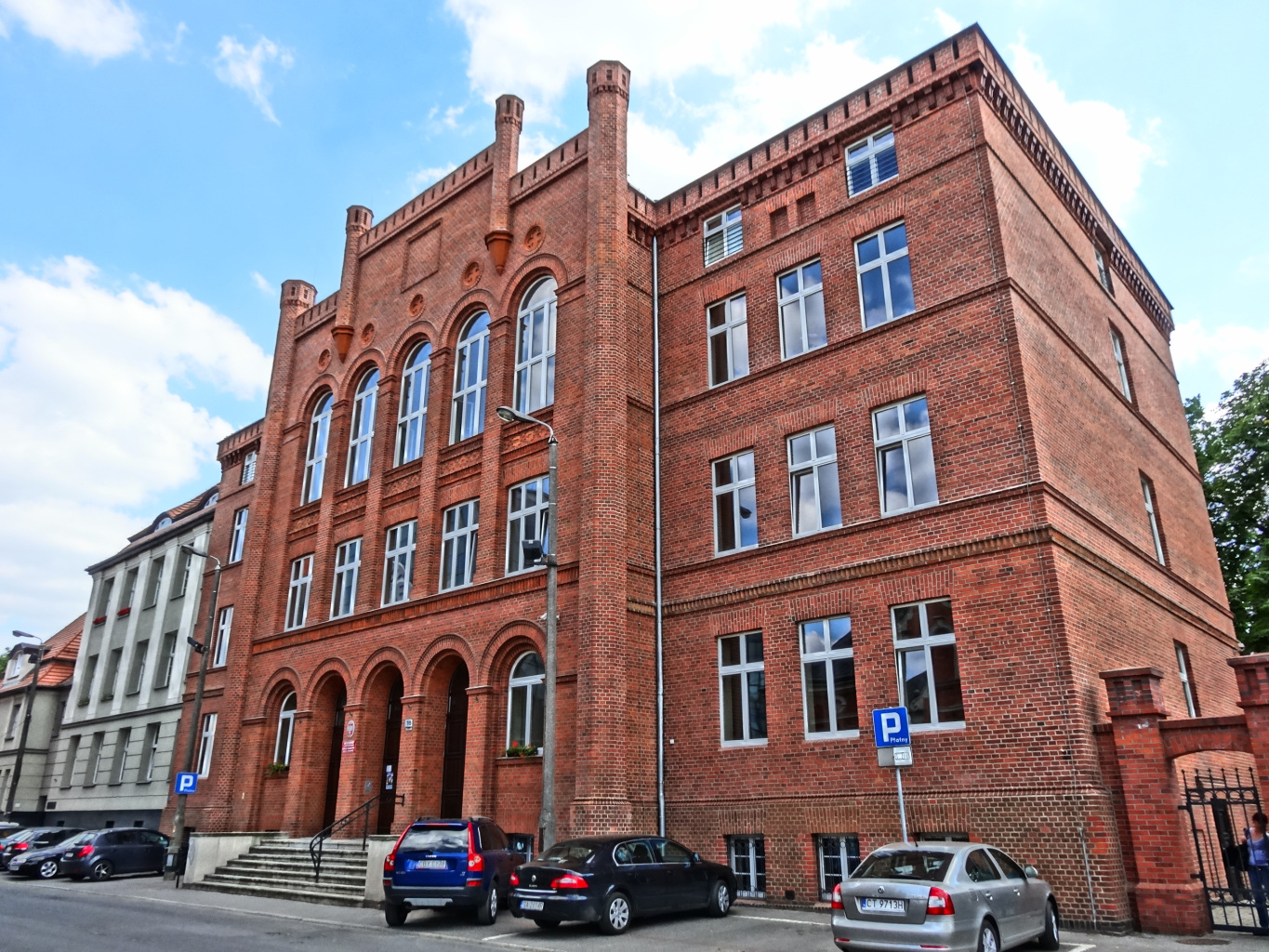
View from Grodzka Street

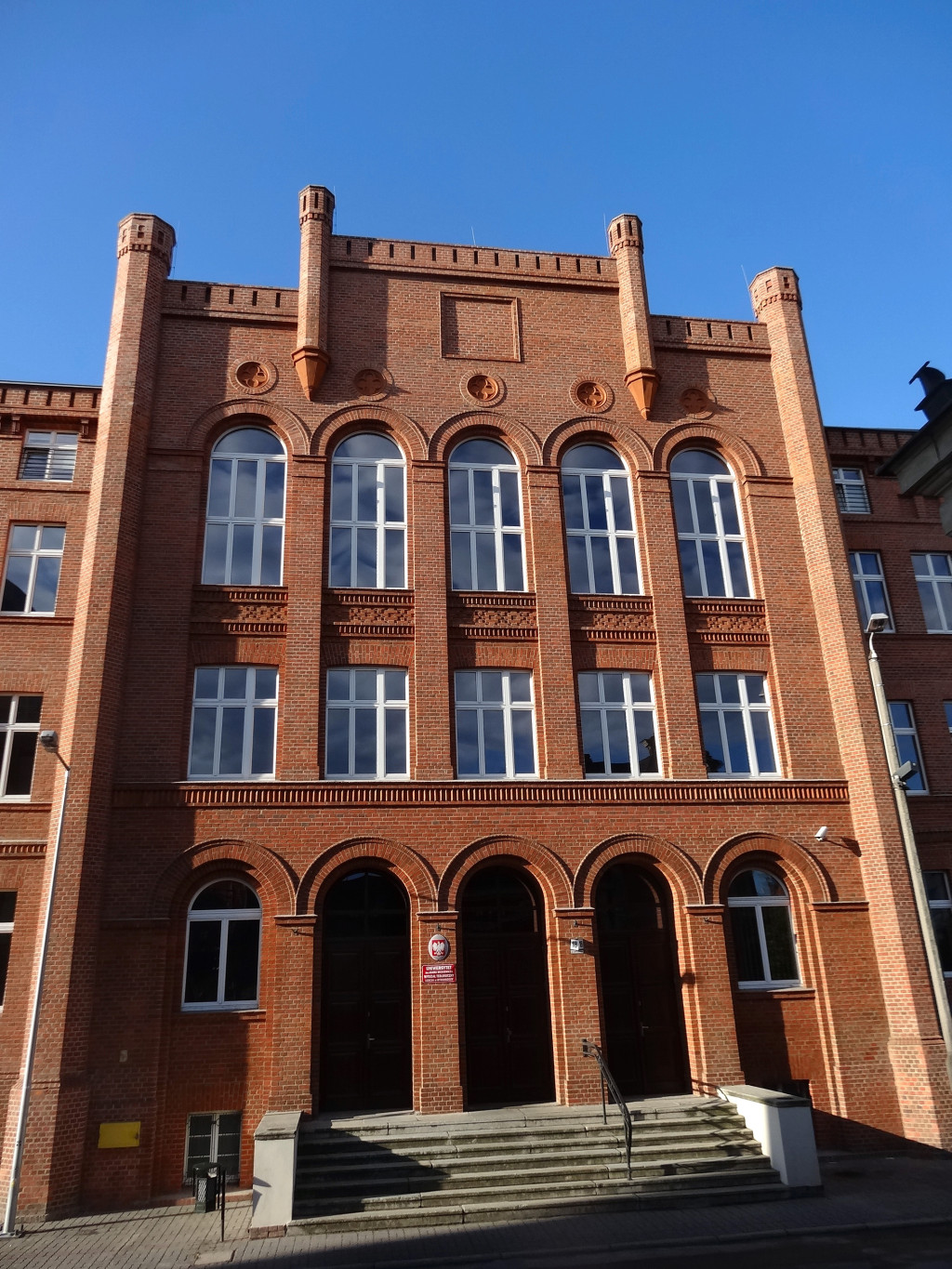
Front facade with its avant-corps

New Granaries at 19/21

Built in 1995–1998 by Andrzej Bulanda and Vladimir Mucha.

The two modern architecture type buildings have built by award-winning designers of an architectural competition, project architects Andrzej Bulanda and Vladimir Mucha from Warsaw. Their shape and style refer to the neighbouring historic granaries on the waterfront, allowing them to blend with the environment. Today, buildings house a branch of mBank (ex BRE Bank). The edifices have received many awards, as icon of modern architecture, among others:

- Grand prize as the most beautiful public building built in the 1990s in Poland in the contest organized by the magazine "Murator";
- SARP 2000 award, from the Association of Polish Architects;
- State Award for outstanding creative achievements in the field of architecture and construction in 2000;
- Platinum Drill for the contractor – the company Budopol SA from Bydgoszcz granted by Bosch;
- The international DIFA Award 2004 together with the nomination Mies van de Rohe in 2001.
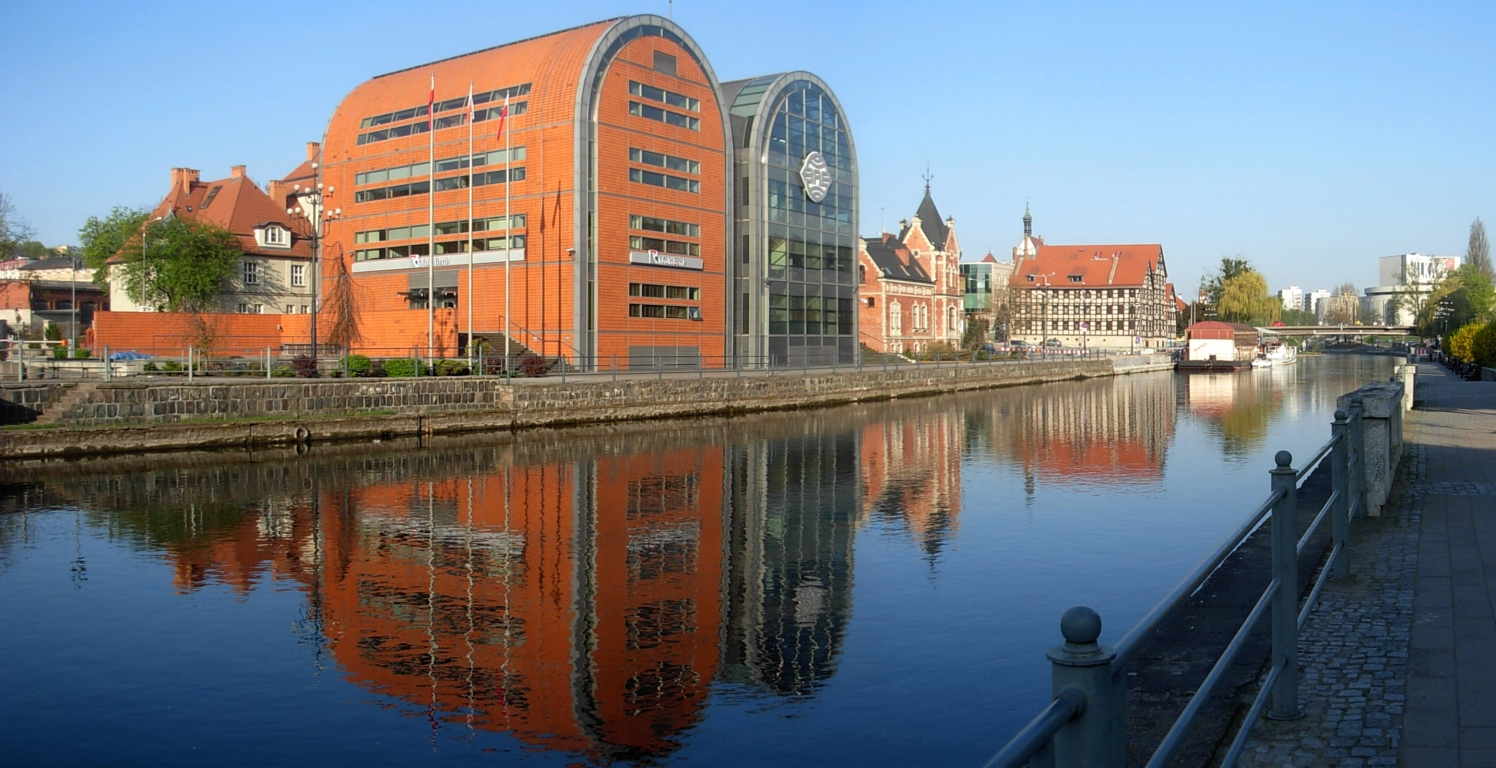
View from opposite bank of Brda river

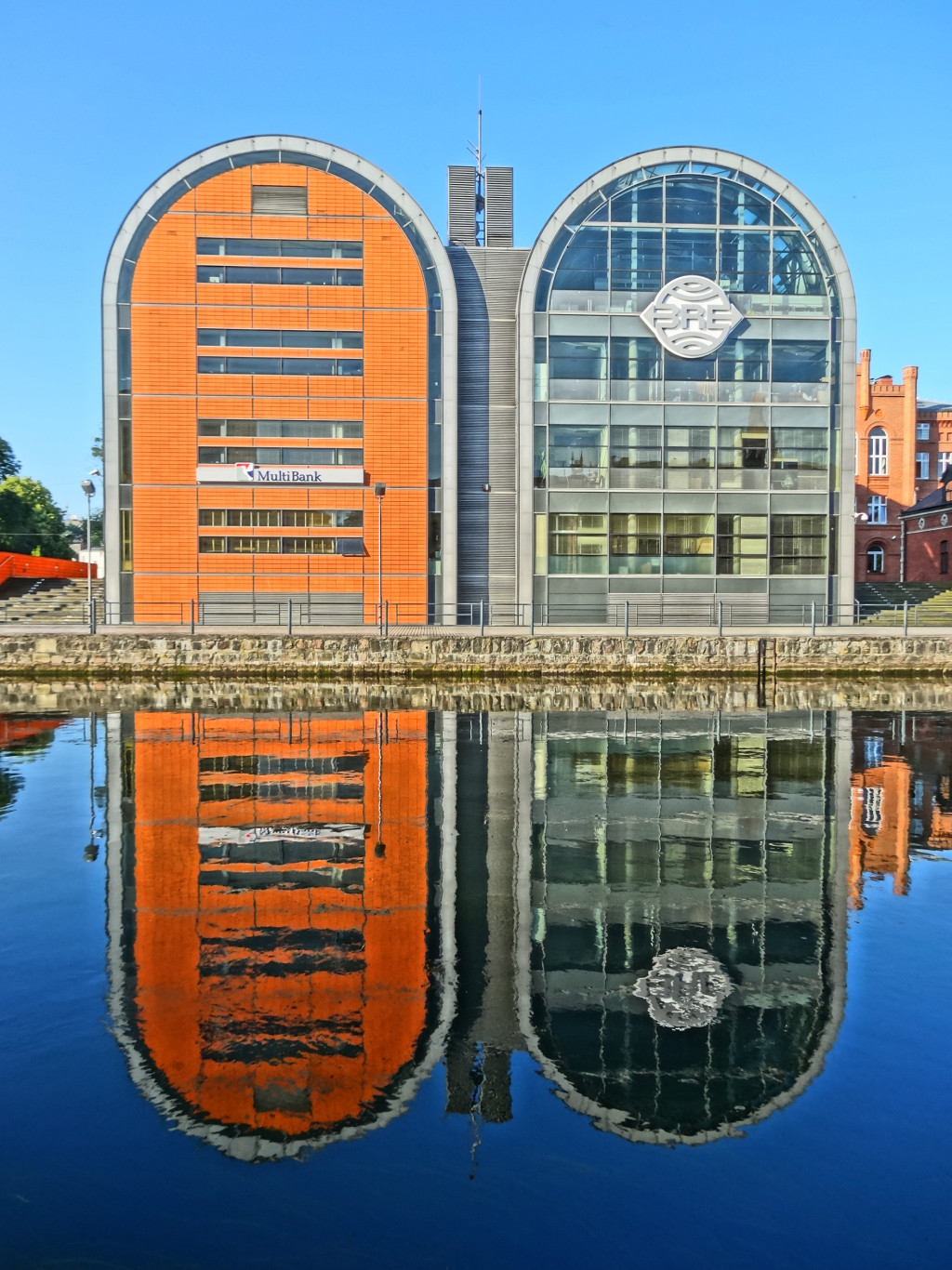
The 2 buildings

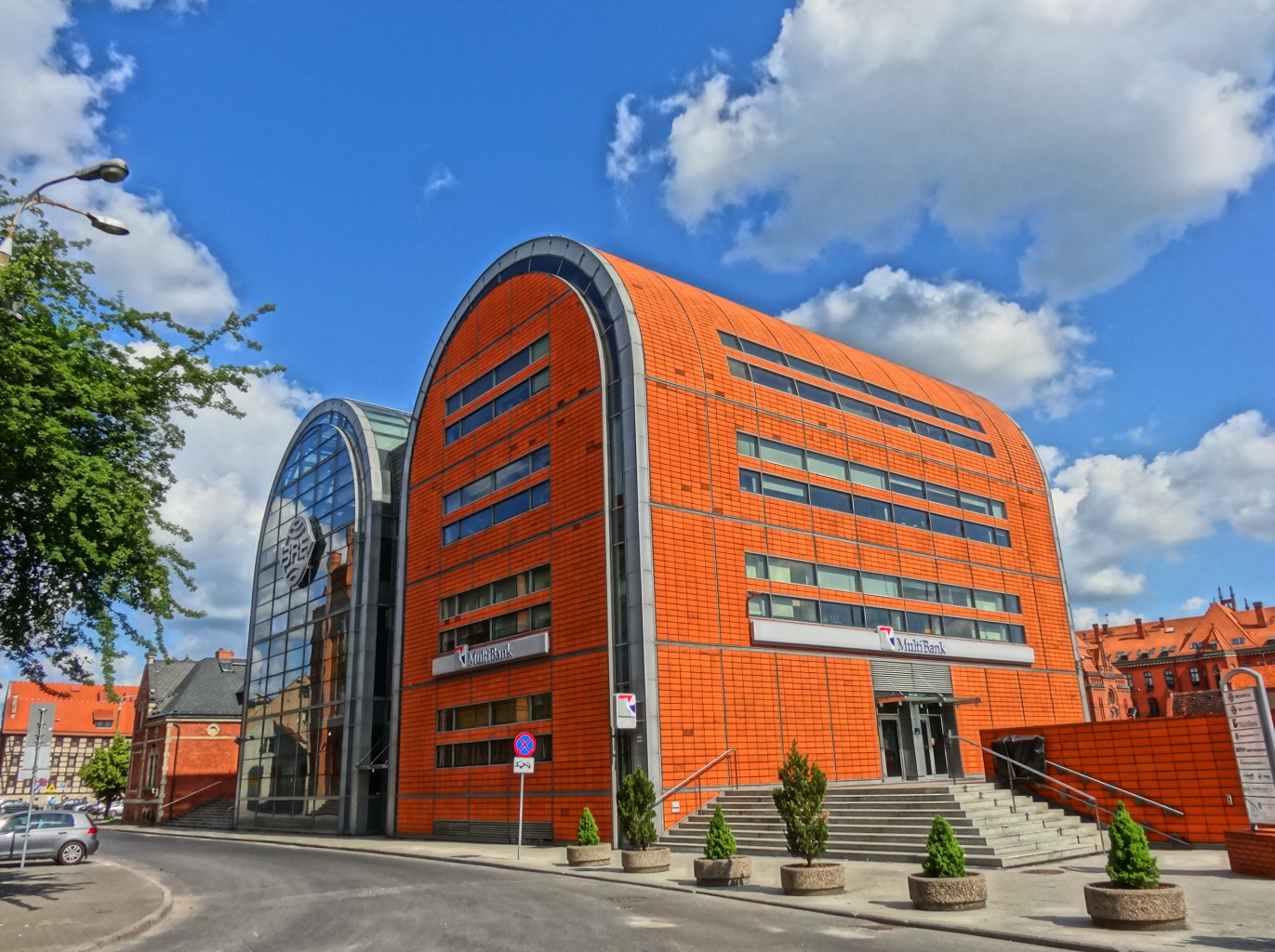
View from Grodzka Street

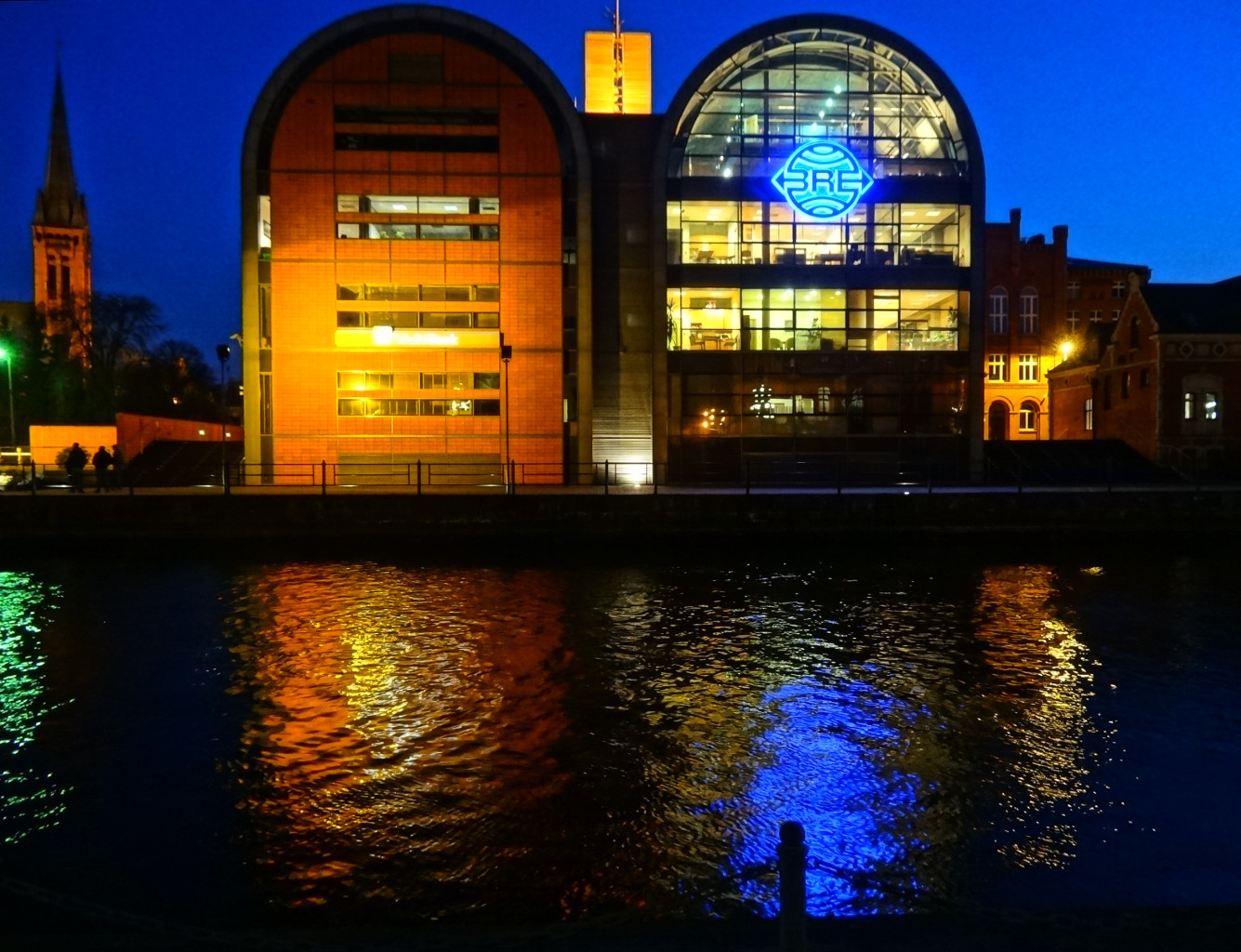
View by night

Plac Solny (Salt Market) is located along the Brda river, between Grodzka Street and Przy Zamczysku Street. It is bordered by PZU building on the east and the new granaries on the west. The square lies on the edge of the old city castle moat. At the beginning of the 19th century, on the plot of today's square were erected cane sugar refineries, partly re-using material from the ruins of the nearby castle. Those refineries were still standing in 1876. Around 1900, with their destruction, the area has been used as a wharf for freight barges following the Oder-Vistula waterway. It is currently used as a parking lot and occasionally as a place to conduct outdoor events.

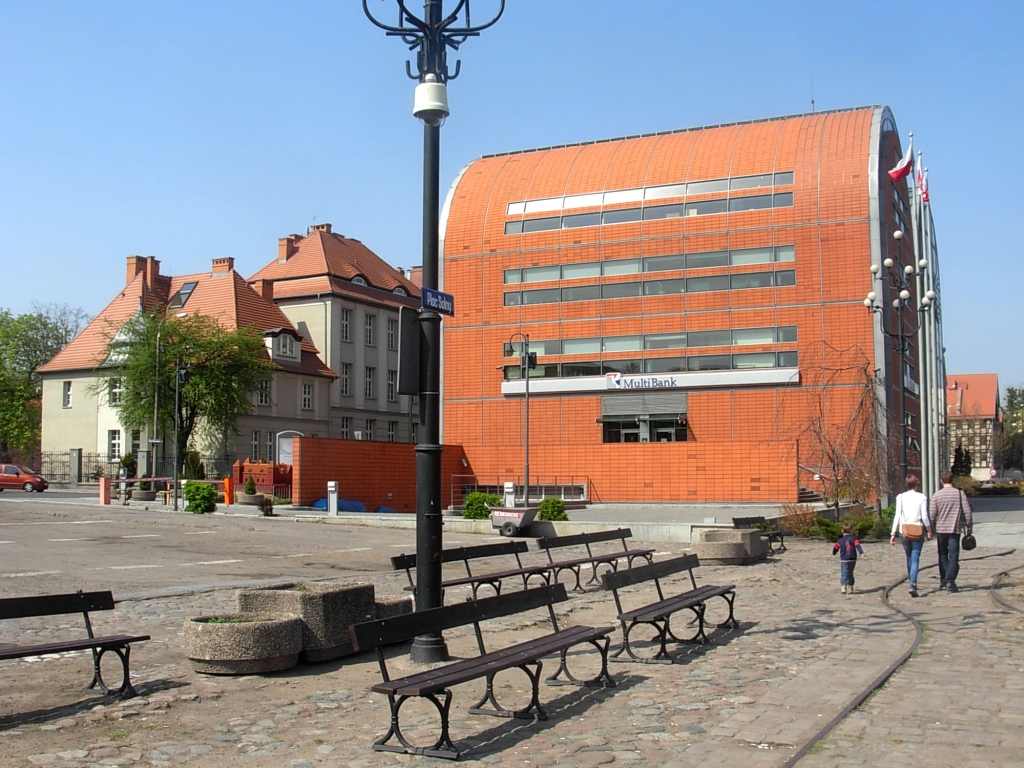
View from the square westward

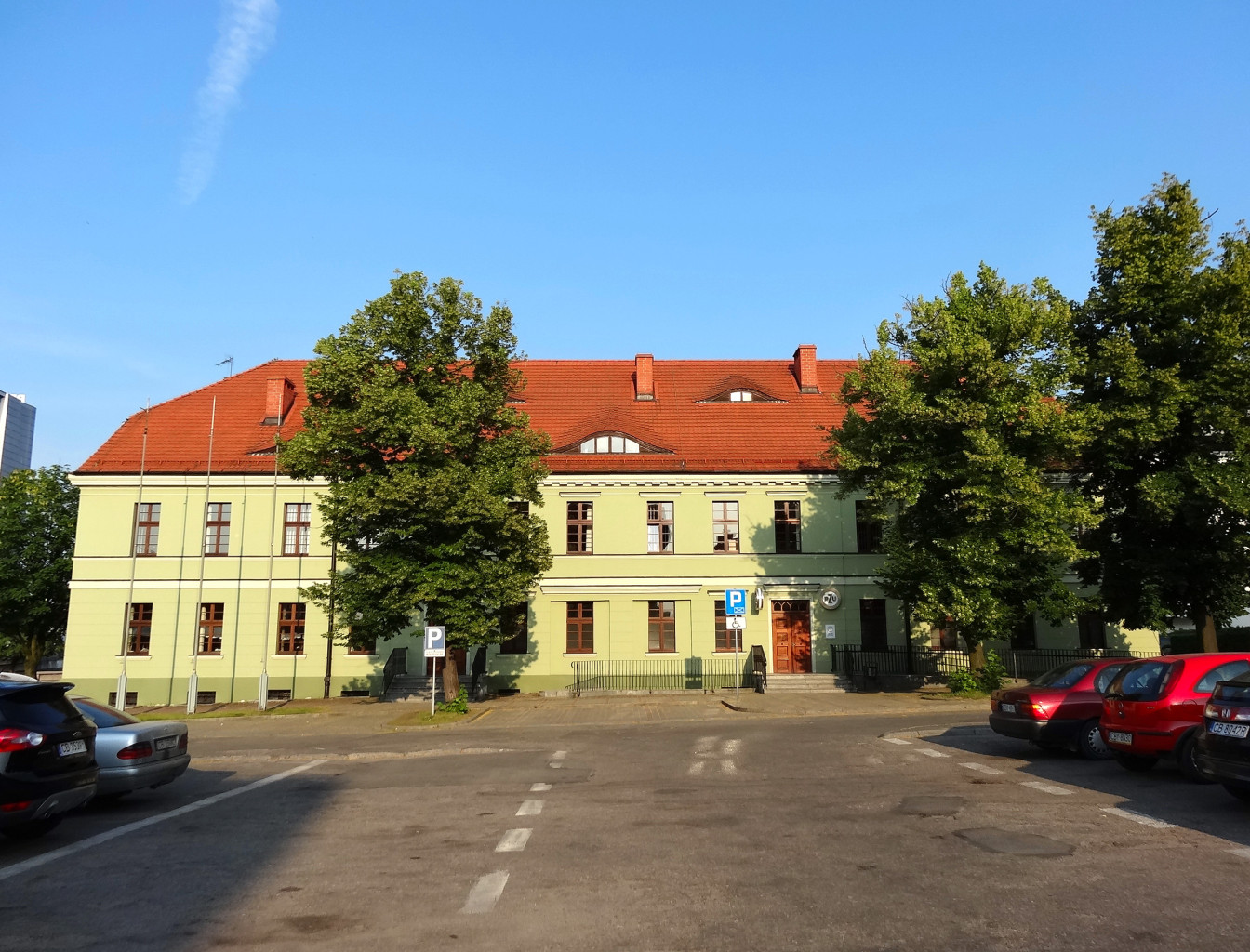
View from the square eastward

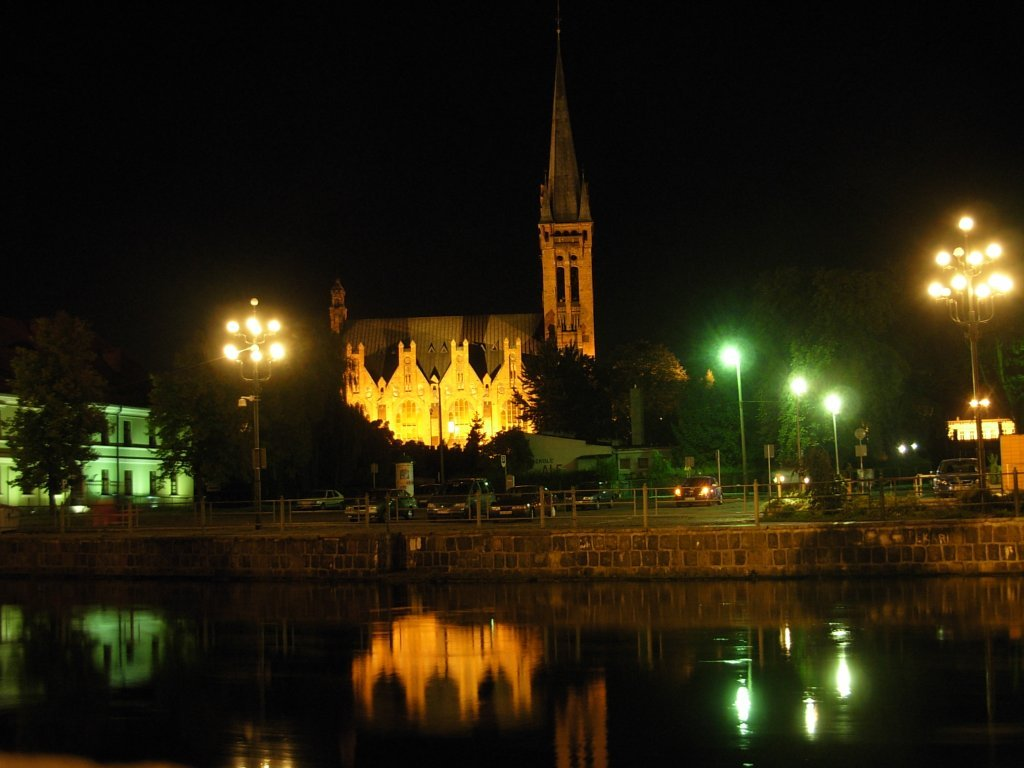
View by night

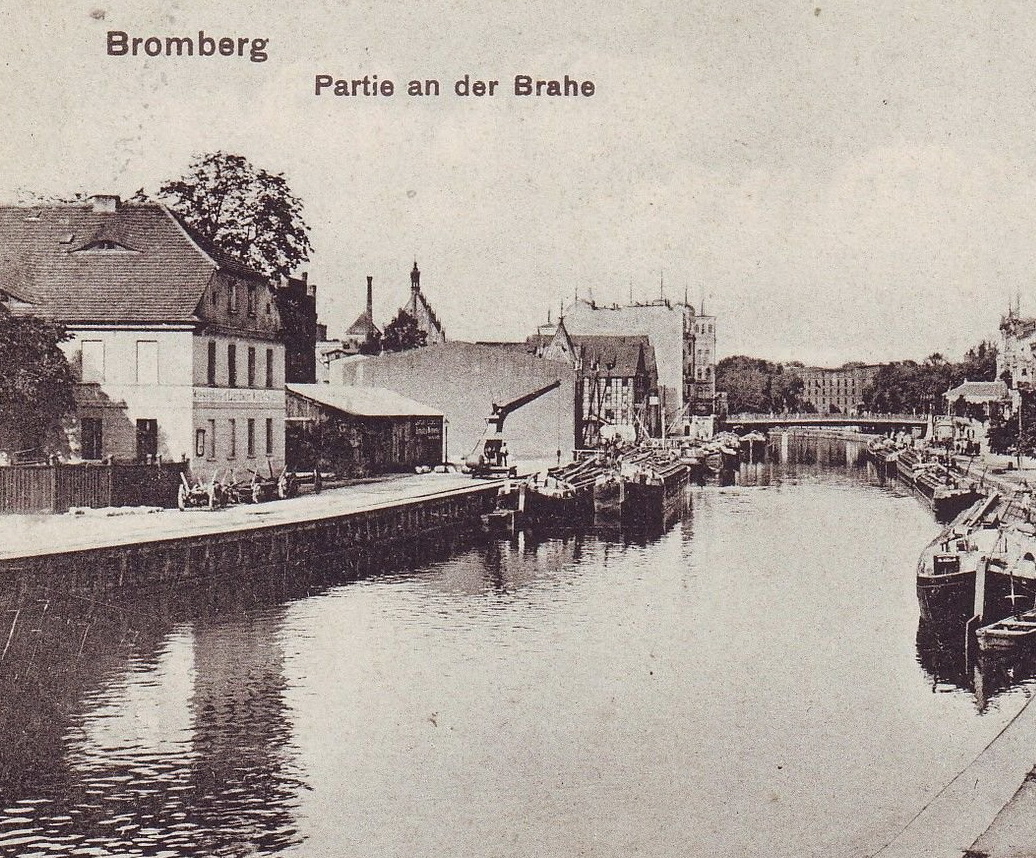
The square ca 1910

PZU building, at 25

Registered on Kuyavian-Pomeranian Voivodeship heritage list, Nr.601344, Reg.A/892 (November 20, 1992).

Erected at the end of the 18th century, the building was located at the very place of the moat of the old city castle. The purpose of the building was to host the "Sugar cane refinery" then newly transferred in 1774 from Berlin to Bydgoszcz. The edifice was part of a series of factories built on the old Salt Square: this one was the largest, used for administrative and residential purposes, but also as a warehouse.

The sugar cane refinery was the largest company in Bydgoszcz at the beginning of the 19th century: raw cane was supplied by water from Gdańsk using Brda river's waterway. The owners of the company, were the Schickler brothers from Berlin, who were also part of the consortium managing Mill Island facilities in 1825. Later the company was taken over by Splittgerber und Daum, one of the oldest Berlin bank. In addition to sugar production, the company also produced clothes for exportation to US (Black Americans market). In 1807, annual sugar production reached 250 tonnes, the company being 20 people strong. In 1818, the sugar production activity stopped and the building was used as storage and selling place for the imported sugar from Berlin refineries. After 1834, buildings refineries complex was sold out.

The administrative building (the only one preserved) was sold in 1855 to city counselor Knopf, who rented it to tenants, hence the four different entries that still exists, associated with various postal addresses. In 1895, the building became the property of the city: it was decided to renovate the interiors to house, among others:

- a school area (in particular an agricultural school);
- a municipal pawnshop;
- a cadastral office (from 1901);
- an industrial office (from 1910);
- a municipal measurements office.

After 1920, the building belonged to the Polish city of Bydgoszcz, which developed departments inside:

- Labour Market Service;
- Court and Merchant Commission Secretariats;
- Unemployment Fund's management board;
- City Police Office;
- Office of Security and Public Order.

In 1936–1939 the building also housed the Municipal Department of Population Records and Statistics and the Airborne and Antigas Defence League secretariat.

During the German occupation, the Nazi labor office was laid in there. A shelter against air raids had been set up in the cellars. After World War II it was allocated for the needs of the Civil Registration Office. In 1977, PZU (National Insurance) Group bought it and rebuilt it in 1981 to the current outshape, mending the repeated devastations undergone so far.

The edifice is built in the style of neo-classicism from the late 18th century. It has decorative cornices and subtle articulation of the walls. It has a pedimented roof and an annex part built from the second half of the 19th century on its eastern side. Foundations studies reveal that part of materials used for the construction came from the then neighbouring ruins of the old castle. In 1995, the building underwent a major renovation. In the square located between the PZU building and Bernardyński bridge on the east stands the Jubilee oak: this tree has been planted on April 23, 1997, to celebrate the 650th anniversary of the creation of Bydgoszcz city.

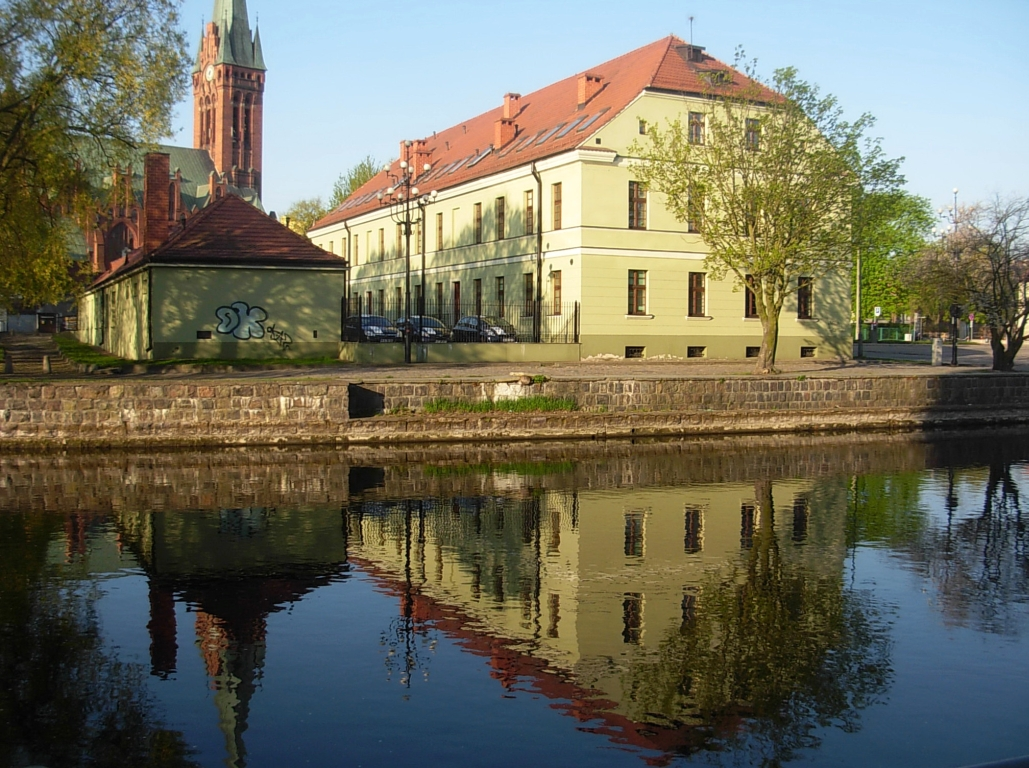
View from opposite river bank

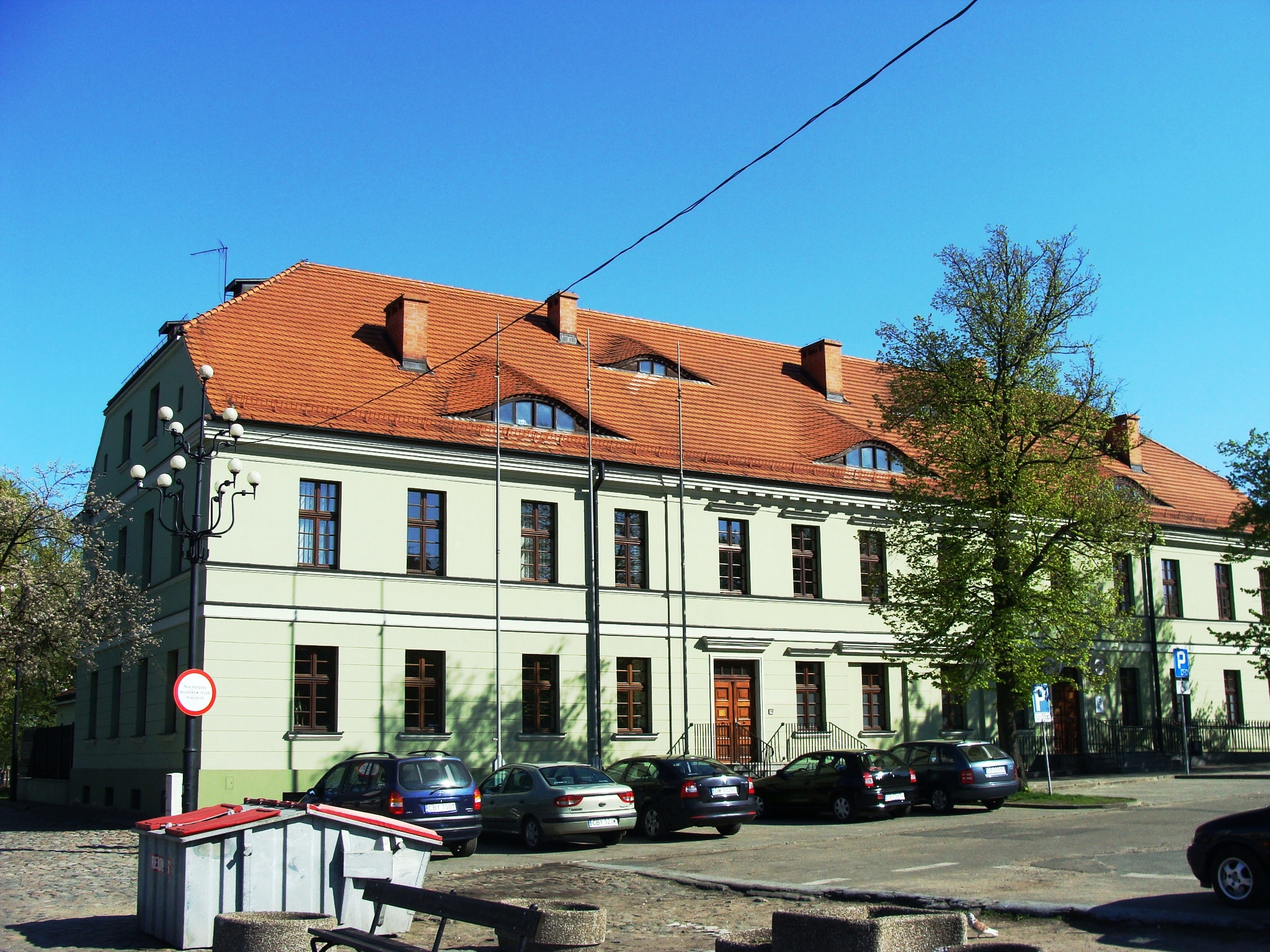
View from Plac Solny

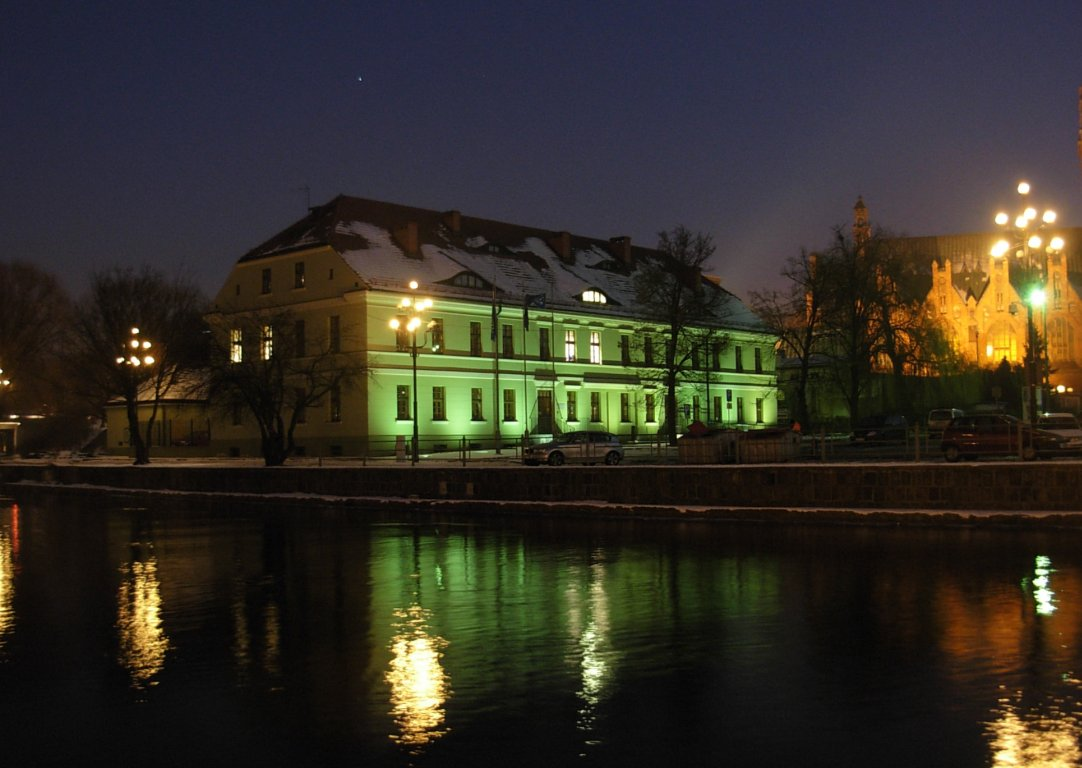
By night

House at 32, built in 1895–1896.

The parapet bears a trumpet, the international mail symbol, evidence that it was once the seat of the Prussian postal administration.

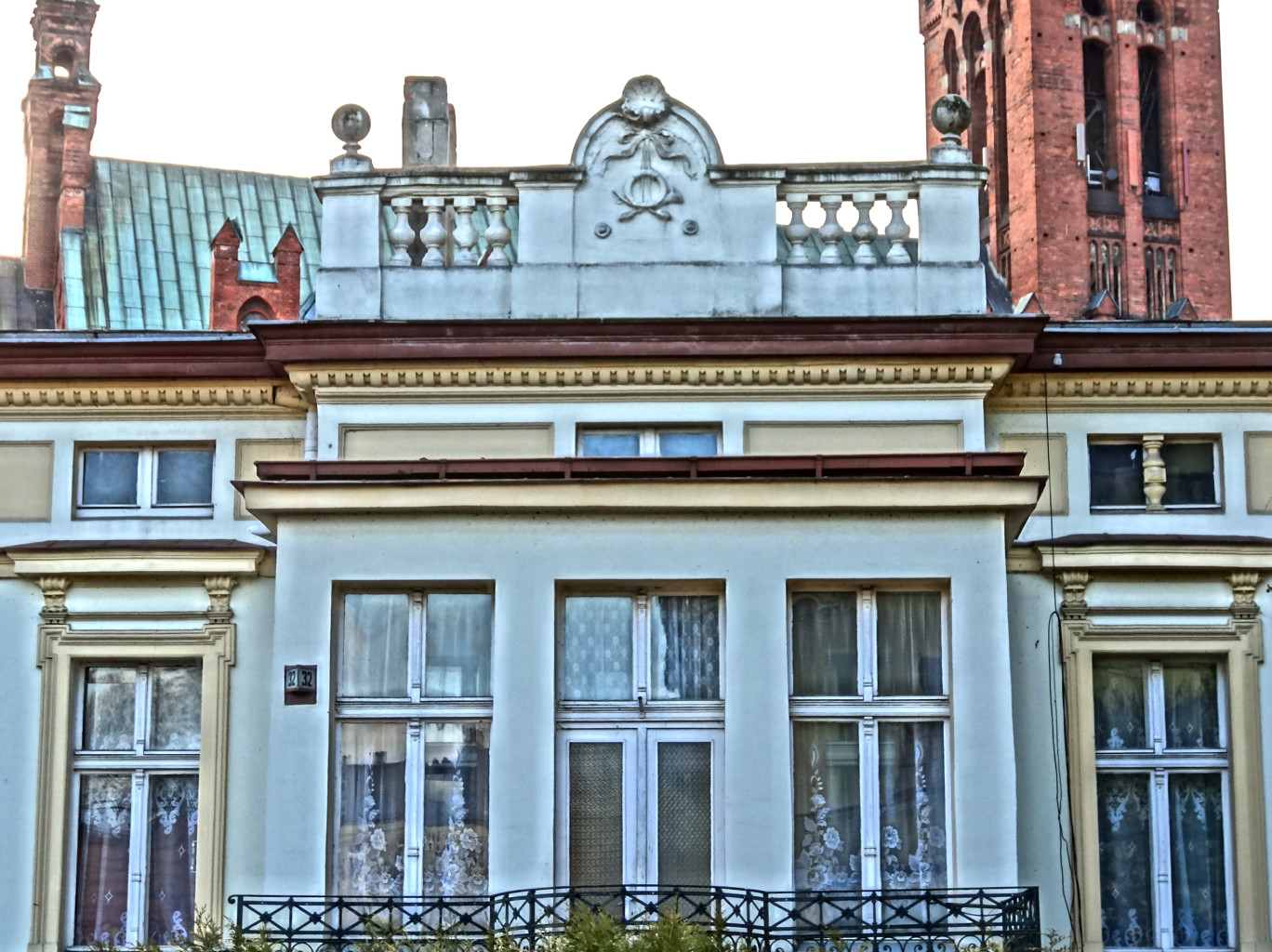
Detail of the parapet

Holiday Inn building, at 36

Built in 2010; this 4-star hotel with 138 rooms has been built at the eastern tip of Grodzka Street.

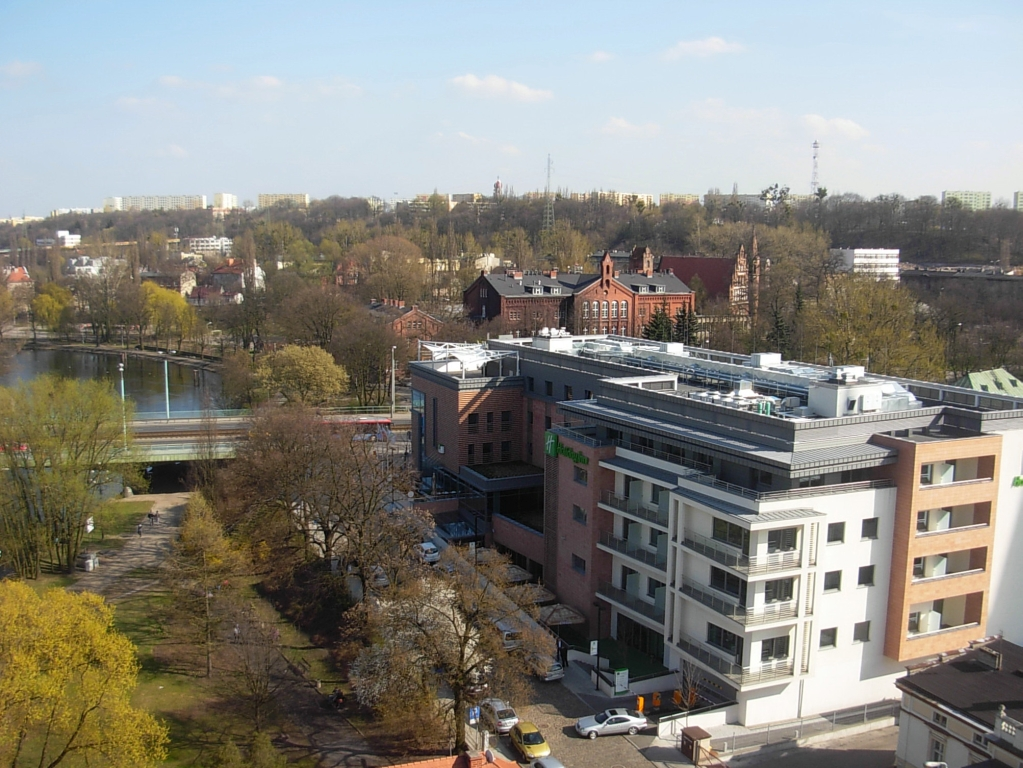
Bird eye view

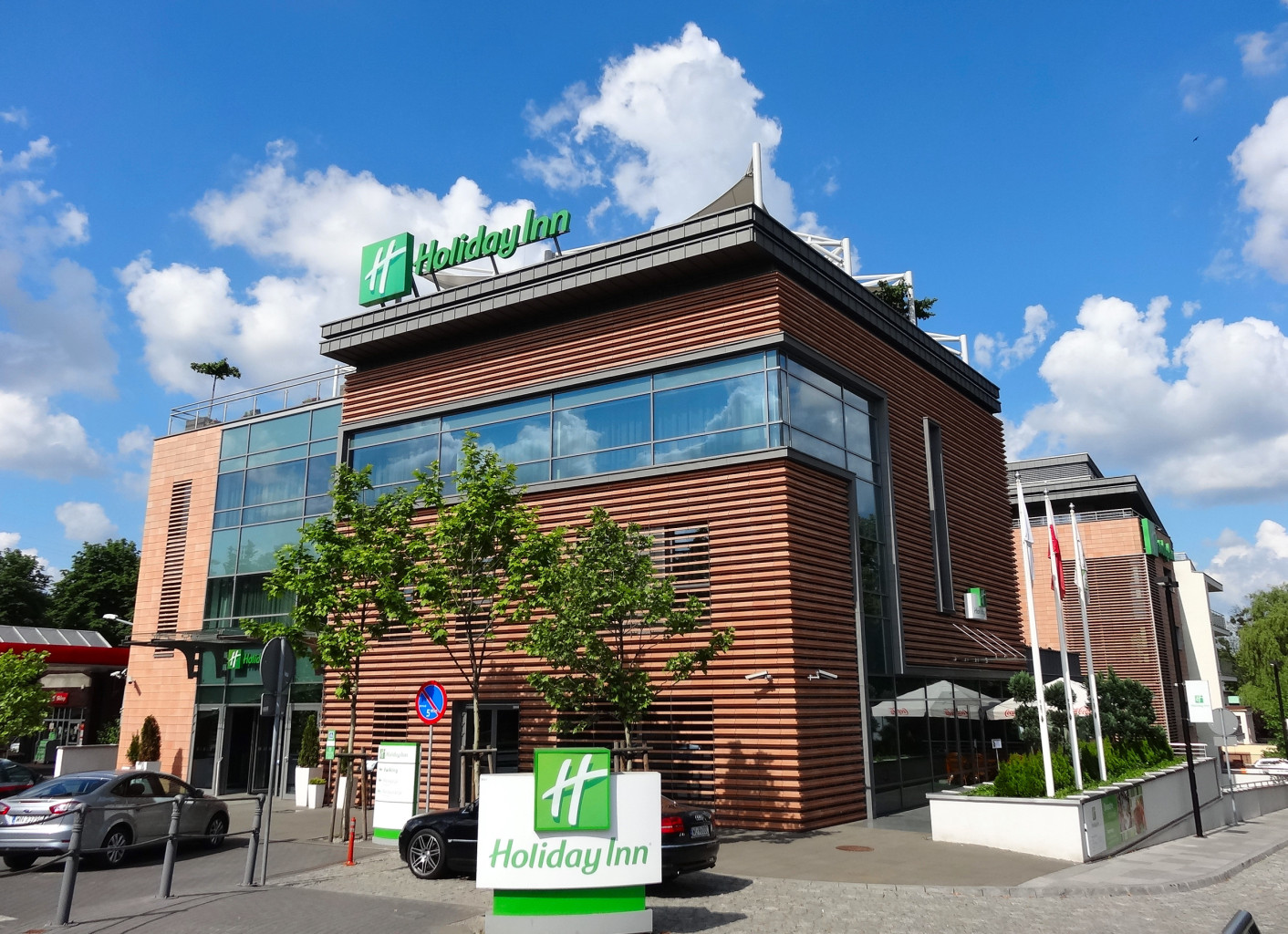
Main entry

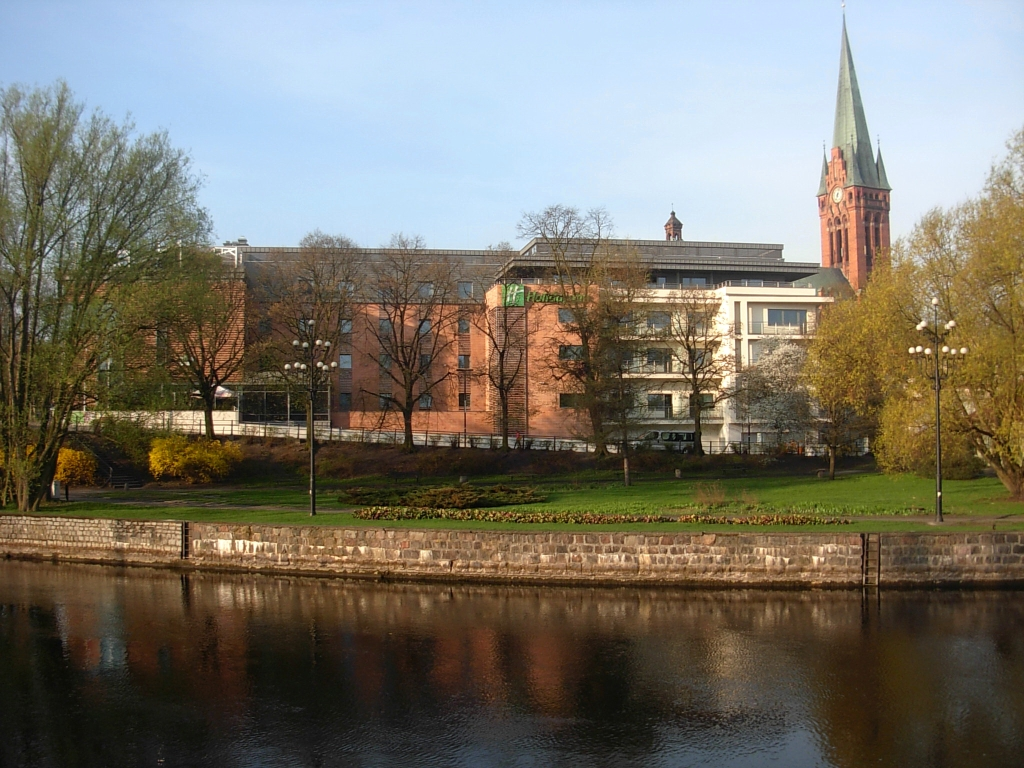
View from opposite river bank
