= Bernardyńska Street, Bydgoszcz =

Street in Bydgoszcz, Poland

Coordinates: 53.1216°N 18.0067°E

Bernardyńska Street
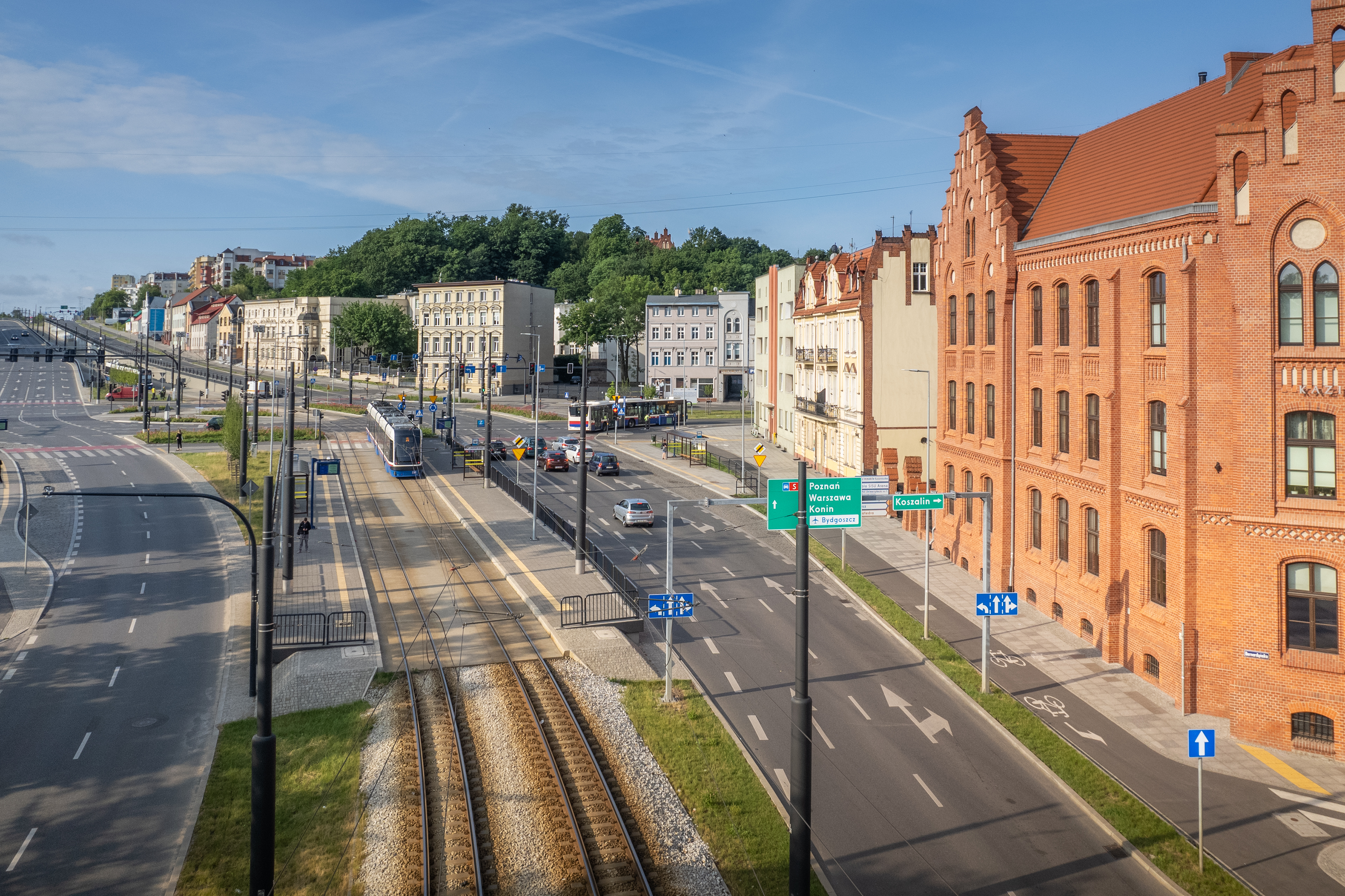
- View of the street

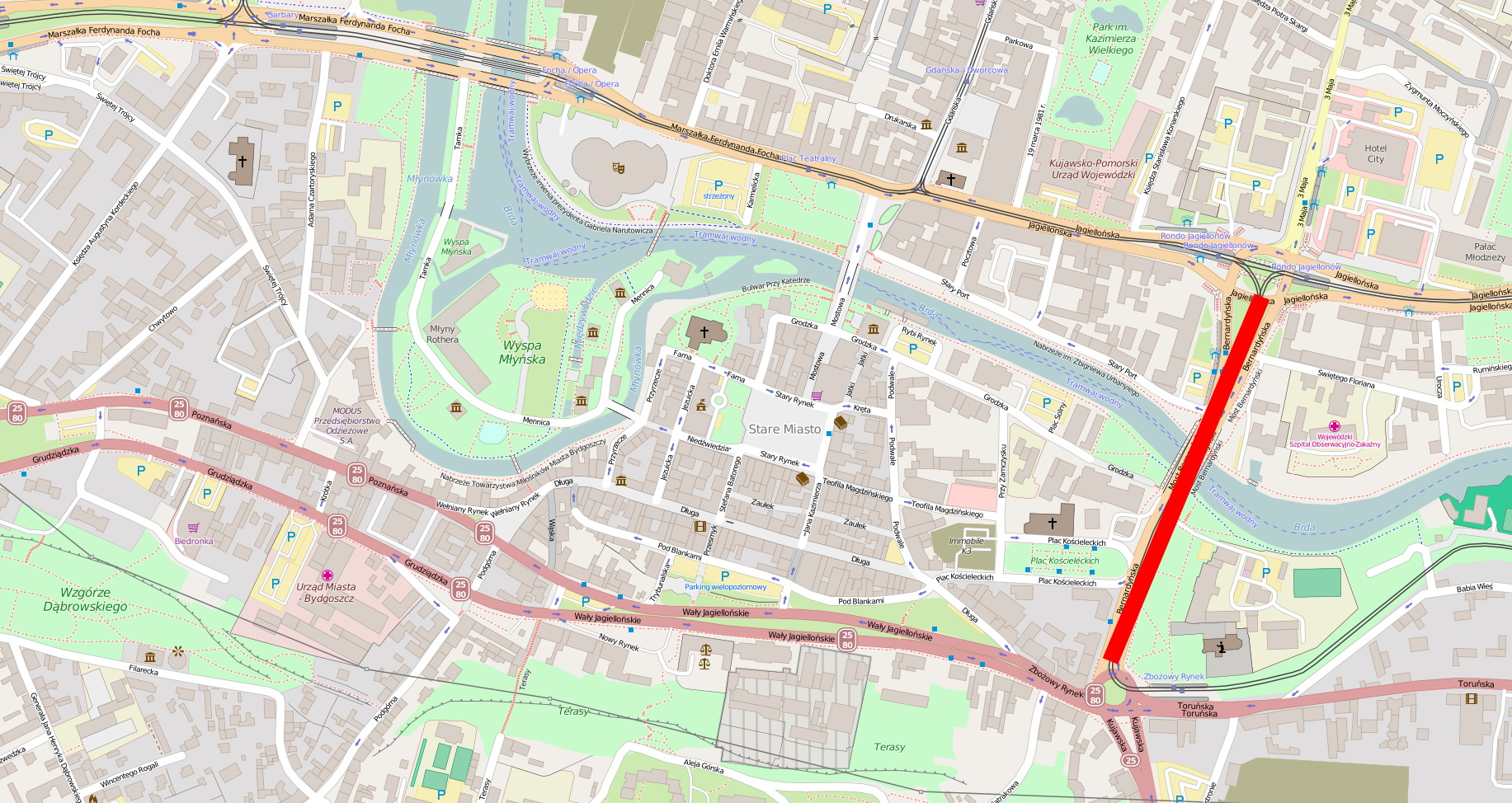
- Location of Bernardyńska Street in Bydgoszcz
- Native name: Ulica Bernardyńska (Polish)
- Former names: Kaiserstraße, Julian Marchlewski street
- Part of: Bydgoszcz Old town district
- Namesake: Cistercian cloister
- Owner: City of Bydgoszcz
- Length: 450 m (1,480 ft)
- Location: Bydgoszcz, Poland

Construction
- Construction start: 1855
- Inauguration: 1872

Bernardyńska Street is a street in Old Town district of Bydgoszcz, Poland. It bears many historical buildings, of which several are listed on Kuyavian-Pomeranian Heritage list.

== Location ==
Bernardyńska street delimitates the eastern edge of the Bydgoszcz Old Town. It extends along a north–south axis, from Jagiellonian roundabout to Bernardyński roundabout, via Bernardyński bridge on the Brda river. Its length is approximately 450 m.

== Naming ==
The street bore the following names:

- 1870–1920, Kaiserstraße, referring to Wilhelm I, German emperor and king of Prussia
- 1920–1939, Bernardyńska Street
- 1939–1945, Kaiserstraße
- 1945–1949, Bernardyńska Street
- 1950–1956, Julian Marchlewski street
- 1956–present Bernardyńska Street

Bernardyńska Street gets its name from the Bernardine Monastery inhabited by monks from 1480 to 1829: today still stands the Church of Our Lady Queen of Peace in Bernardyńska Street.

== History ==
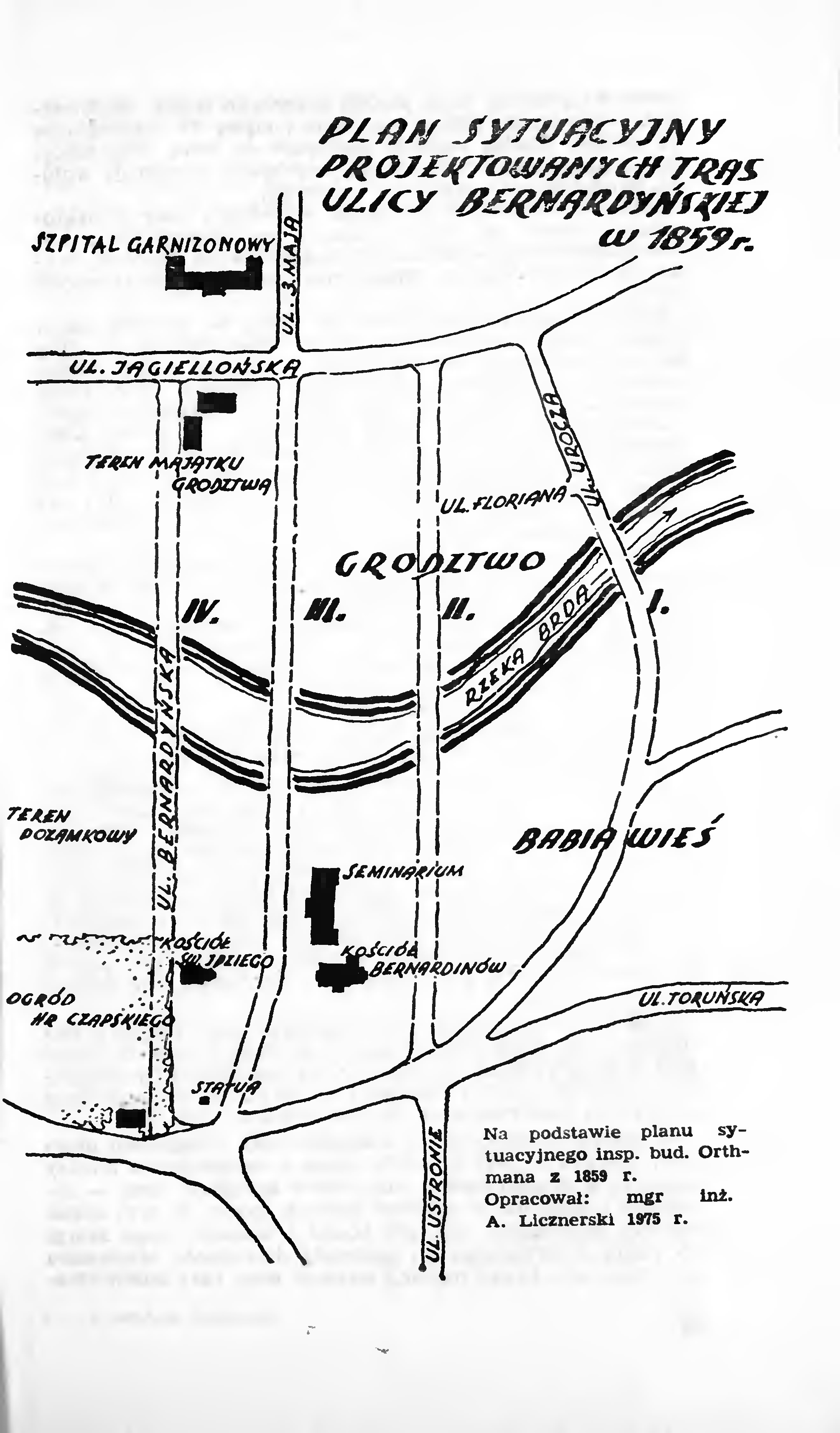
Study of the different street paths, c. 1859

Bernardyńska Street was born from a mid-19th century project to extend the road connecting the Old Town to the suburbs. In addition, the construction of the a Prussian Eastern Railway line passing through Bydgoszcz in 1851 and the building of the main station in the north-west of the city emphasized the need of a new bridge over the Brda River, so as to abate the traffic in Mostowa street and its narrow bridge. The eastern location was selected because of the need to reach the newly created suburbs in the 1830s.

On December 7, 1855, an official application was filled for the construction of the new in the area of the former Bernardine monastery. Many official and financial difficulties, associated with the definition of the course of the street and acquisitions of terrain made the project drag on, coming to completion only 20 years later (1875): discussions with landlords and neighborhood about path locations went on till 1863!

Another problem has been to cover the cost of "Most Bernardyński", the bridge over the Brda river, which was a key element of the route: Prussian authorities conditioned the approval of the project upon the realization of a single-span bridge structure, leaving the navigation on the river open and safe. The issue has been solved only in 1866, with a promise from the Prussian government to fund the bridge.

The construction work for the bridge started in 1867, first steel elements set on May 15, 1870, and the final completion of the Bernardyńska street occurred in 1872. The new axis was named "Emperor street", (German: Kaiserstraße), in honor of William I, at that time newly proclaimed Emperor of the German Empire.

== Main places and buildings ==
Tenement at 1A

20th century

Modern architecture

The house has been razed in 2019 to give way to the construction of the tram line on Kujawska.

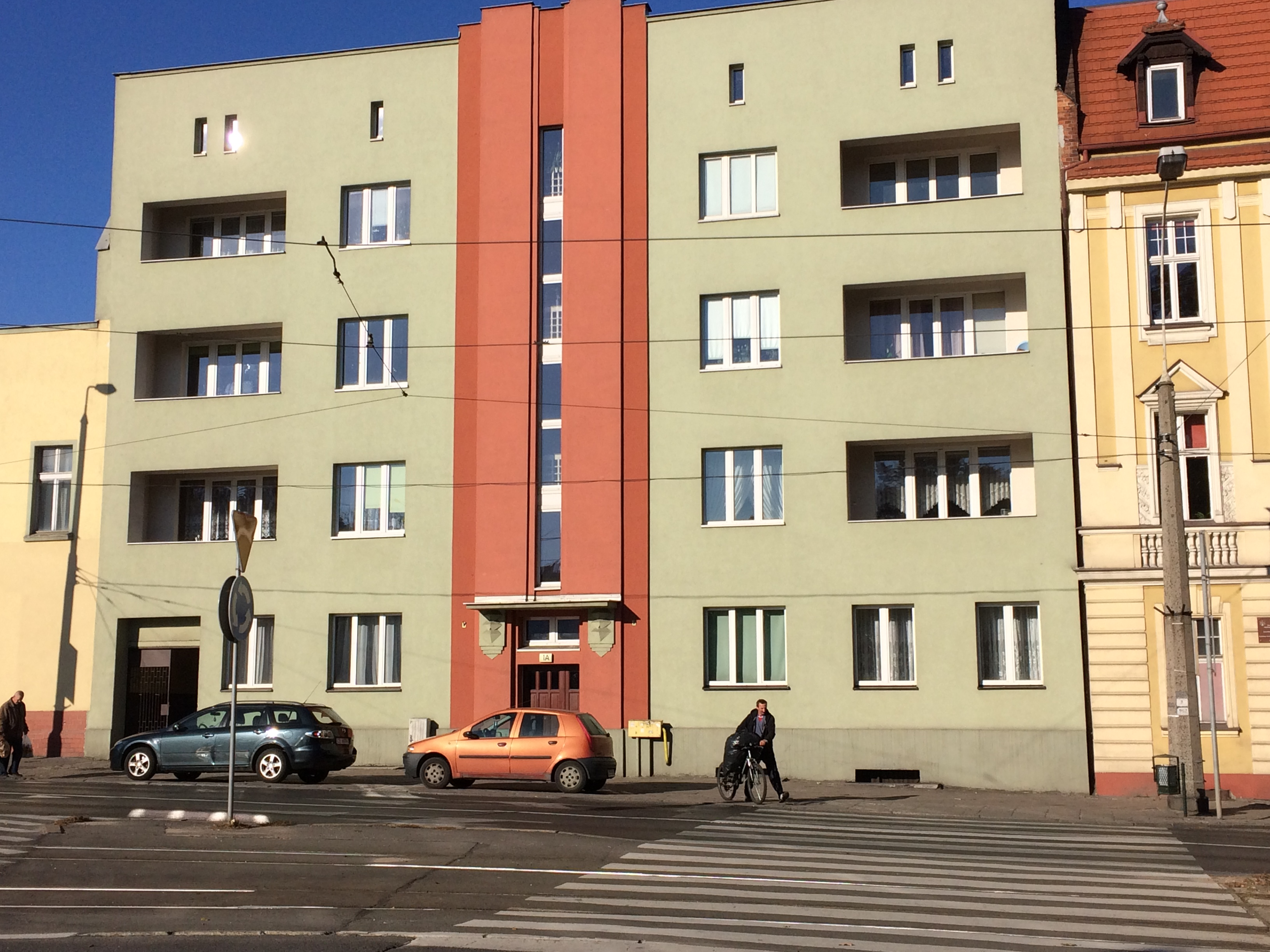
Main view from the street

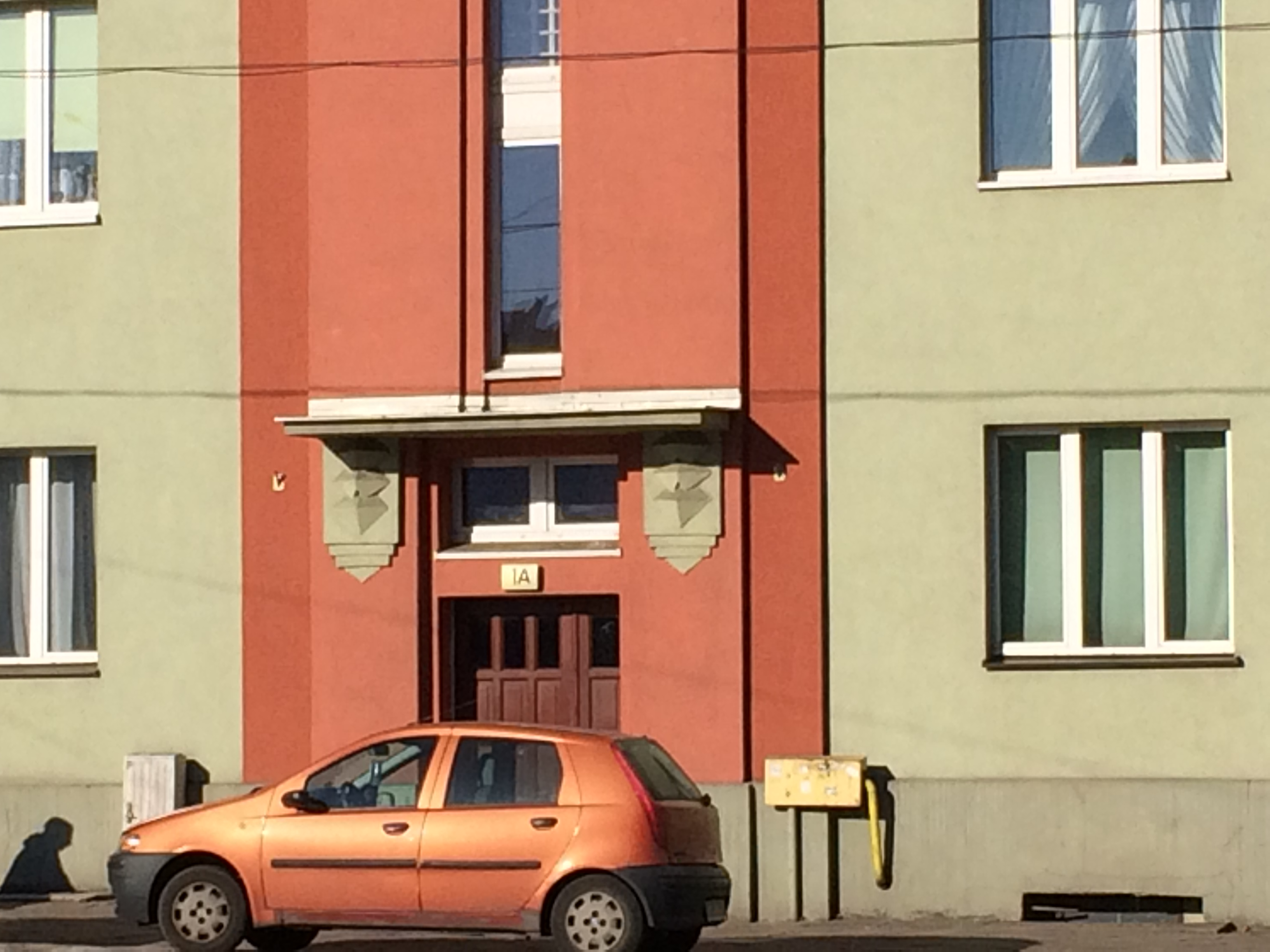
Detail of the entrance

Tenement at 3 1893–1905, by Karl Bergner

Neo-Baroque

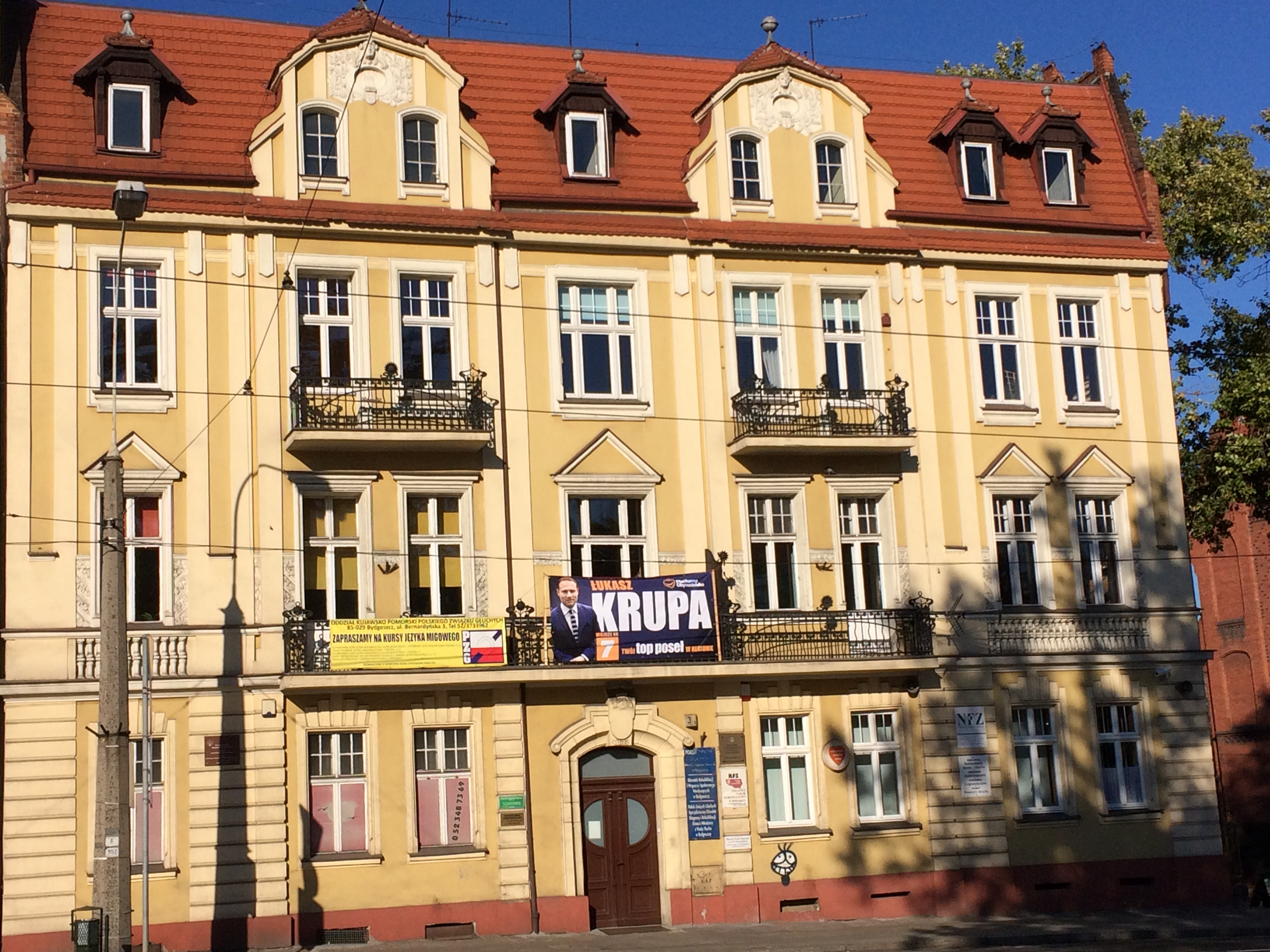
Main frontage

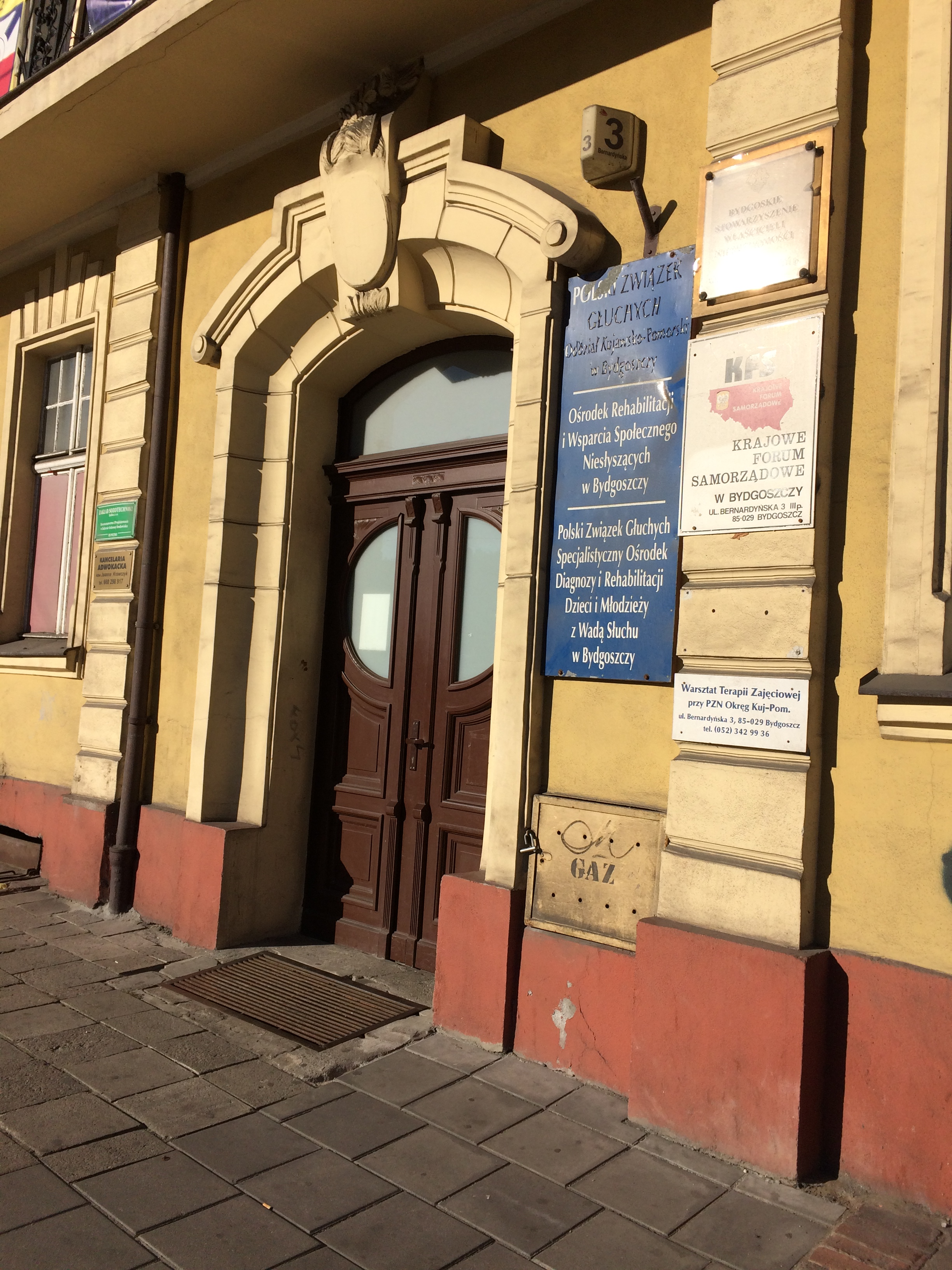
Detail of the gate

Bernardine Church of Our Lady Queen of Peace

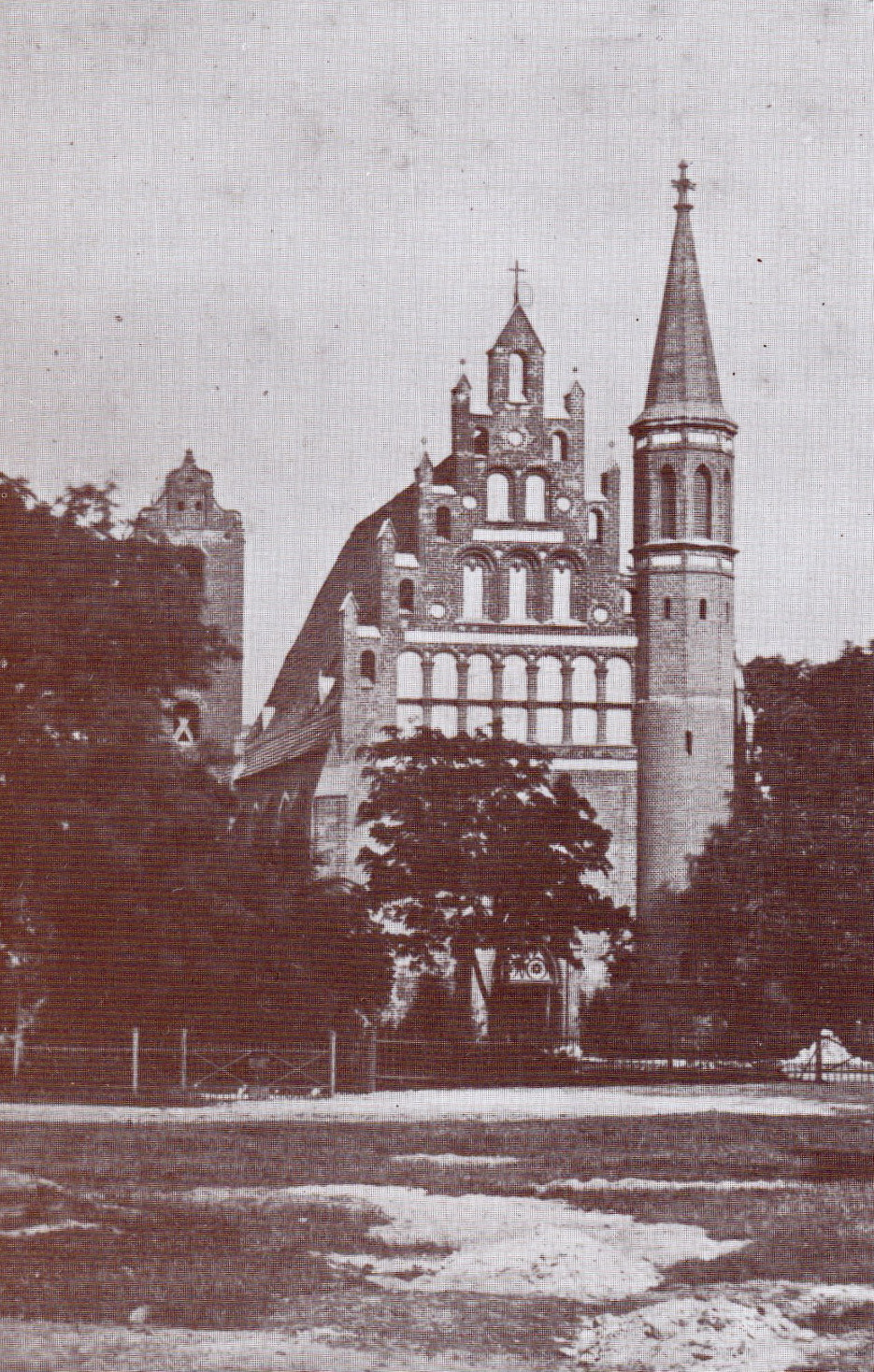
Church Bernardinska 1880

Registered on Kuyavian-Pomeranian Heritage list Nr.601227, Reg.A/674 (March 4, 1931) and Nr.601228, Reg.A/674 (September 30, 1992)

Mid-16th century

Polish Gothic architecture, Renaissance architecture

The origin of the church dates back to the arrival in 1480 of Bernardine monks in Bydgoszcz, coming from Kraków. In the years 1518–1524, the abbey was led by Bartholomew of Bydgoszcz, a scholar, author of the first Latin-Polish dictionary (1532, 1544). On September 23, 1552, King Sigismund II Augustus granted permission for the reconstruction of the burned Bernardine church., with a caveat to its height that should not be taller than the neighboring castle for military-defensive purposes. Its architecture reflects Gothic and Renaissance characteristics. After 1920, Polish authorities confirmed the use of the church for garrison purposes, as it is still used today. The church has been re-consecrated in 1923, by military bishop Stanisław Gall. In 1926, it was renamed Saint George military parish church.

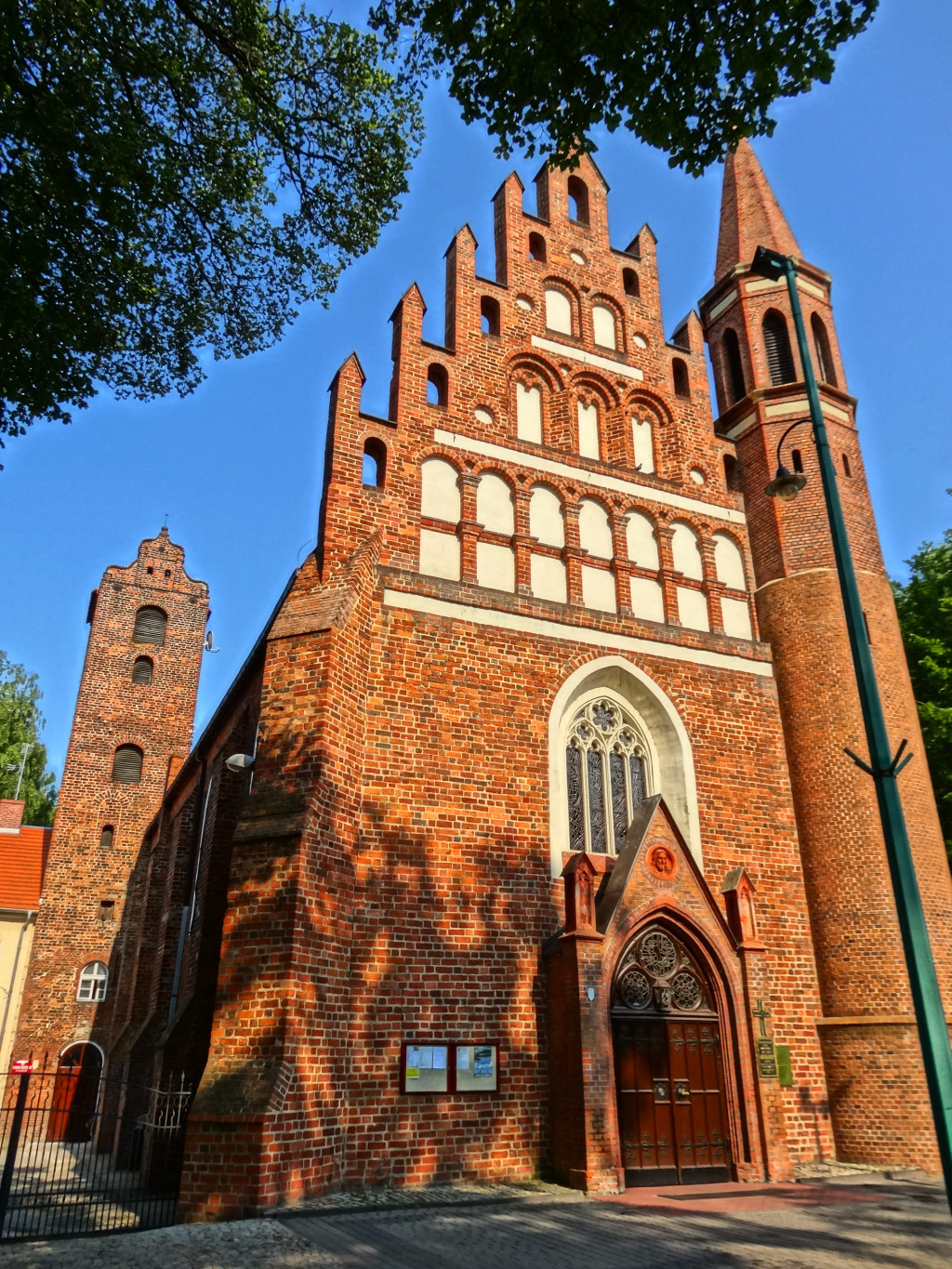
Main elevation with church tower in the backdrop

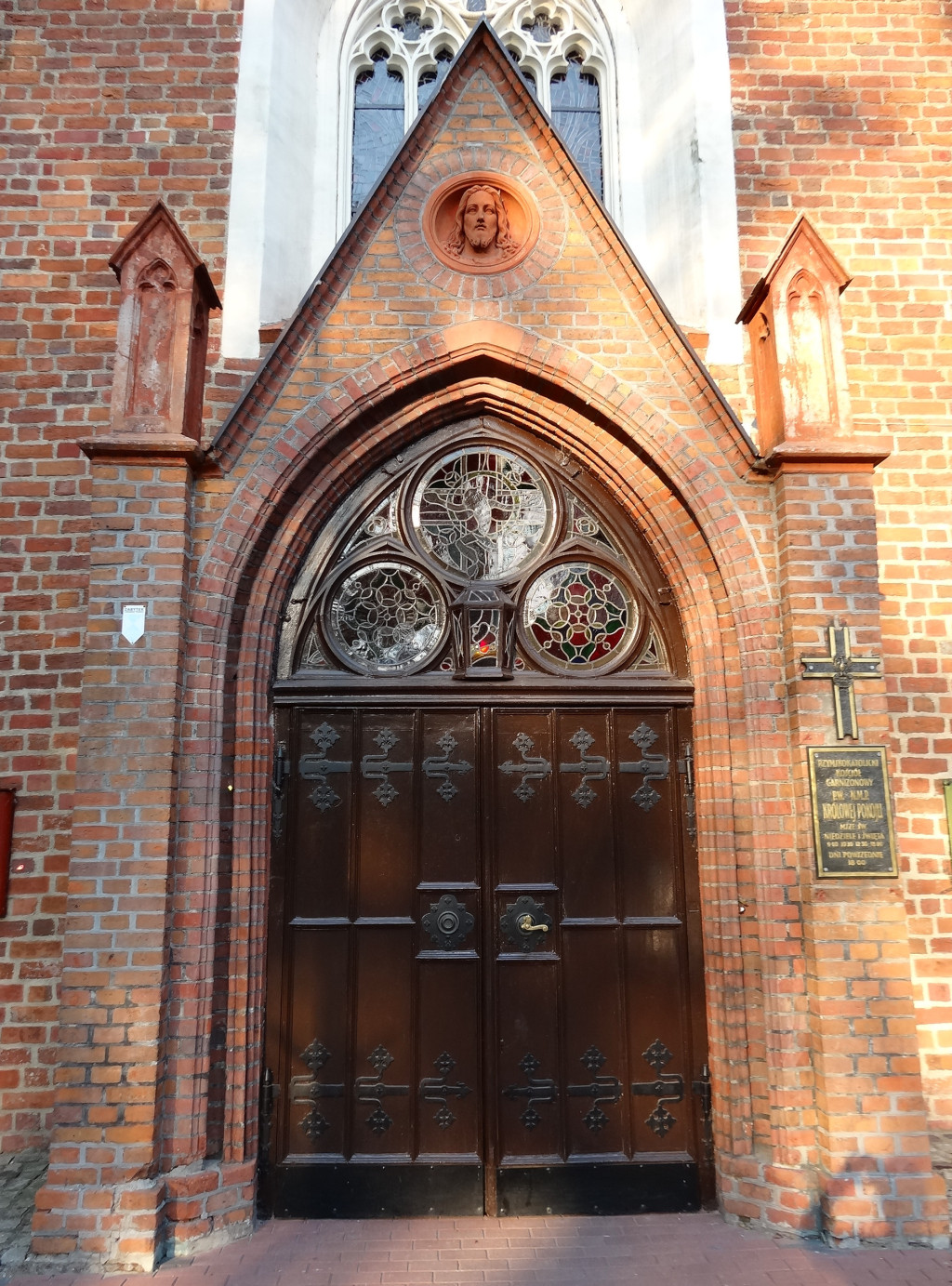
Main portal

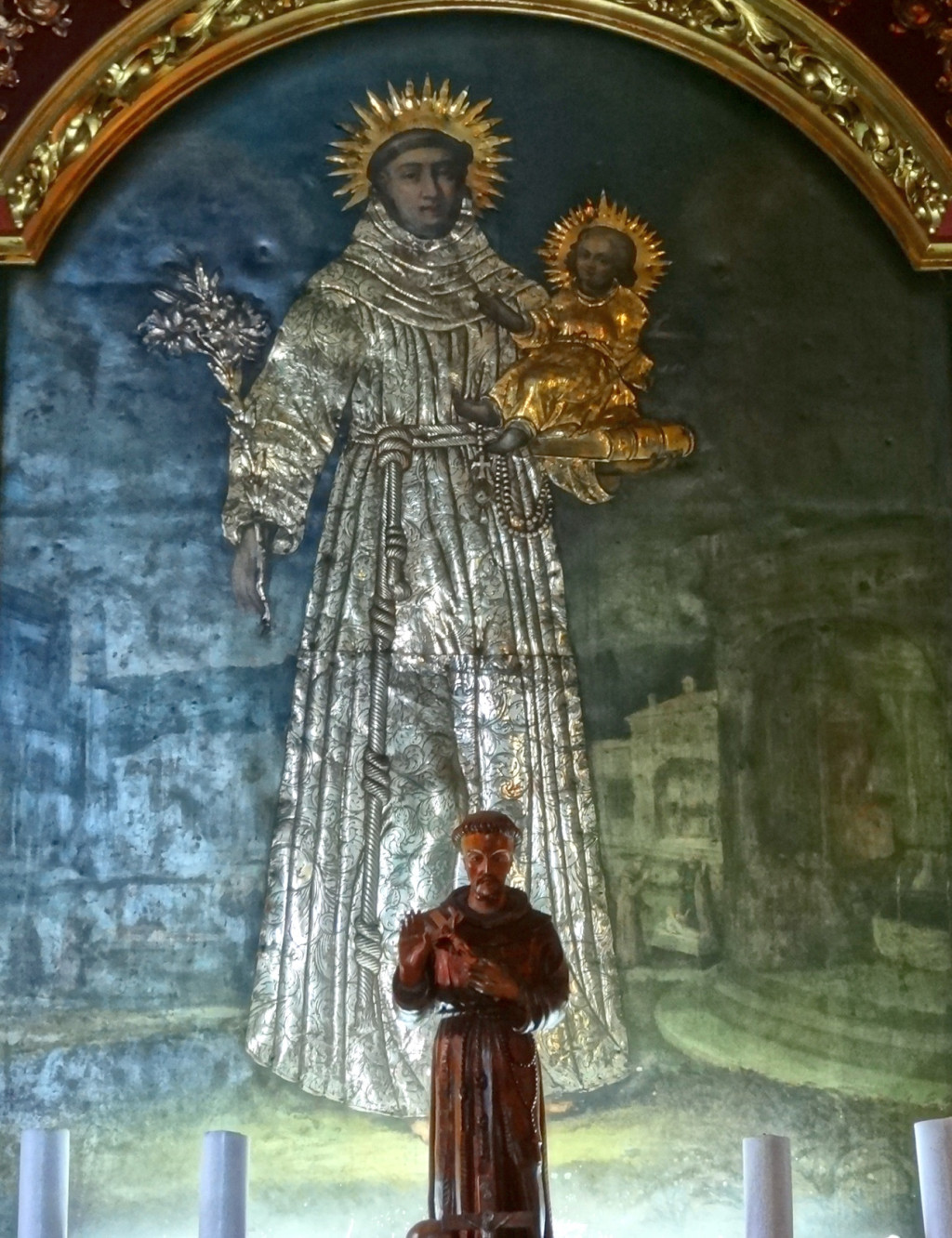
Saint Anthony altar, now in Bydgoszcz cathedral

Building at 6

Registered on Kuyavian-Pomeranian Heritage list Nr.601266, Reg.A/675 (September 30, 1992).

1867–1872

Historicism, elements of Neo-Gothic and Neo-Romanesque

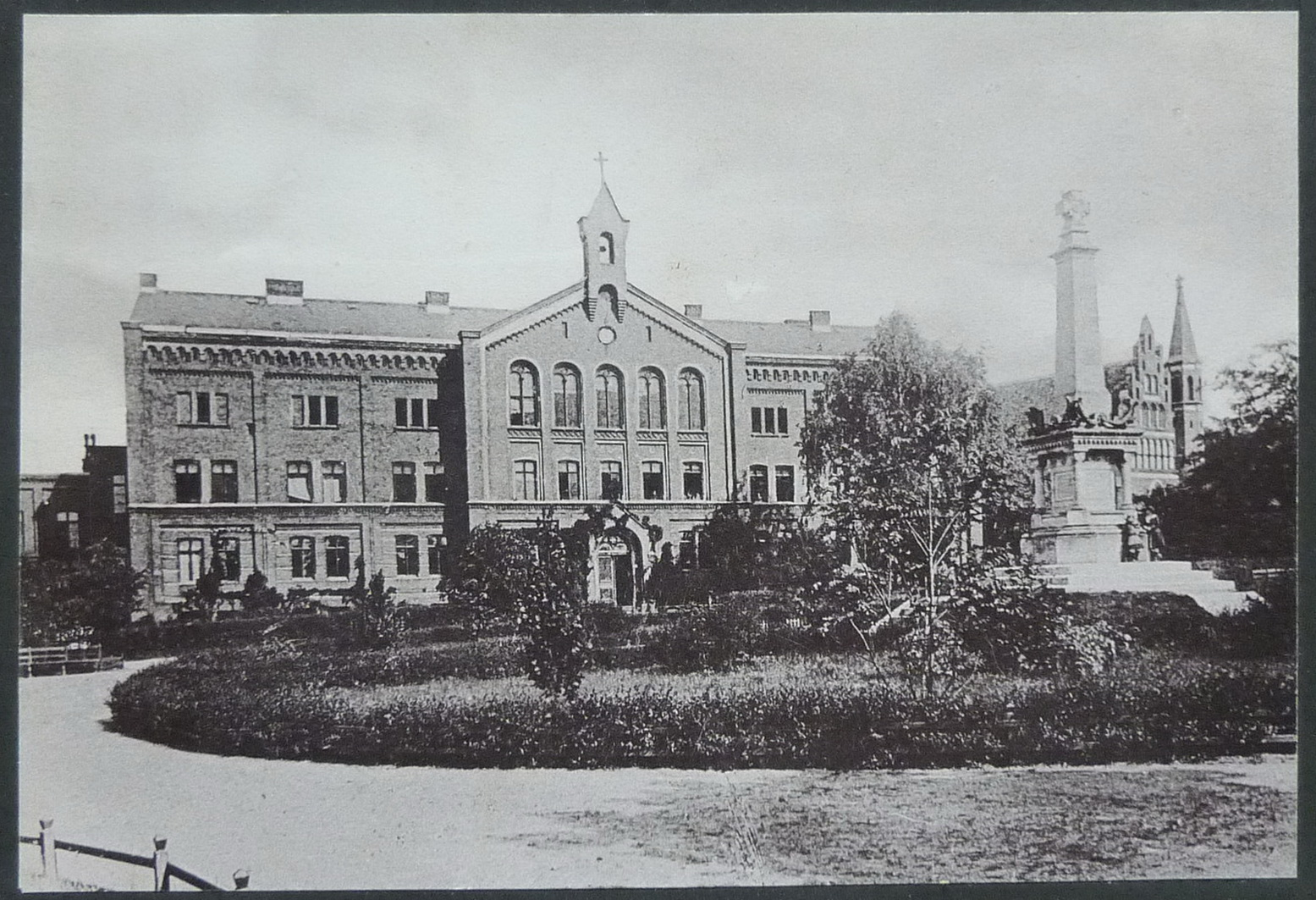
6 Bernardinska, 1880

The building was erected in the late 1860s for the Evangelical Seminary Teachers, linked to a medium-sized state school in Bromberg. The seminar has been created on May 1, 1820, one of three centers of this type in Grand Duchy of Posen. The facility trained teachers for urban and rural elementary schools. From 1822, the Prussian Ministry began to part from the evangelical education institutions, where youth of all faiths were attending. In Bromberg, it was decided that the seminary would educate evangelical teachers, while in Poznań the same institution was converted into a school for catholic teachers. In Bromberg, a separate Catholic seminary would be created later on. The seminary took quickly the character of a German Protestant philosophy institution from 1825. Nearby, the ancient Bernardine monastery housed in 1830 a Lutheran community. In the years 1867–1872, while partly rebuilding the monastery, an evangelical seminary was also constructed in the vicinity. At that time, it was a three-year curriculum. Seminary was financed from state resources. Courses, apart from general and pedagogical subjects, also considered singing, music instruments, as well as horticulture and handicraft. After 1920, when Bydgoszcz rejoined the re-created Poland, massive outflow of Germans from the city let the Protestant seminary for teachers useless. The building then housed in 1923 the University of Agriculture coming from Poznań. It was a 2.5 year long school which accepted applicants over the age of 17, having completed the sixth class of high school and one year of general practice in the farm. The curriculum changed to three years for boys, as a State Secondary School of Agriculture. In 1927, 86 students were enlisted, of which 46 coming from rural area. In 1935, the institution was transformed into a State High School Farm, the first in the country, culminating with the matura examination, which grants the access to university. The school building provided excellent housing conditions. On the back of the property was a large vegetable and fruit garden, in addition the school had its own 90 ha farm in the vicinity of Bydgoszcz.

During Nazi occupation, the building housed the German Labour Office. After the end of World War II, the Polish Labour Office has been standing there, then a Technical Equipment department. In the late 1960s, the edifice has accommodated a branch of the University of Life Sciences in Poznań, focusing on agriculture (and animal husbandry from 1972). In 1971, with the return of the Agricultural College to Poznań, the institution became an independent branch of the university of Bydgoszcz as a Faculty of Agriculture (Division of zootechnics). Department headquarters were located in the building at Bernardyńska street 6, with other facilities in Hetmańska and Mazowiecki streets as well as in Osielsko. At that time, it employed 80 teachers. In 1974, after the merger of the College of Engineering with Bydgoszcz Faculty of Agriculture, the building housed the seat of the Department of Agriculture of Bydgoszcz university. In 1975, this department was the first at the university to be granted the right to confer doctoral degrees in agricultural sciences. In 1991, some departments were transferred to the new university facility in Fordon and to a building on Kordecki street. Since 2006, the edifice houses a Department of Agriculture and Biotechnology from the University of Technology and Life Sciences of Bydgoszcz.

The building displays characteristics from Historicism, with elements of Neo-Gothic and Neo-Romanesque. Its footprint is rectangle, with a basement and two storeys. the front avant-corps is topped by a triangular, with a tower which used to house a bell. Front upper floor in the avant-corps has got arched windows. Brick facades are divided by narrow pilasters and decorated with arcade cornices.

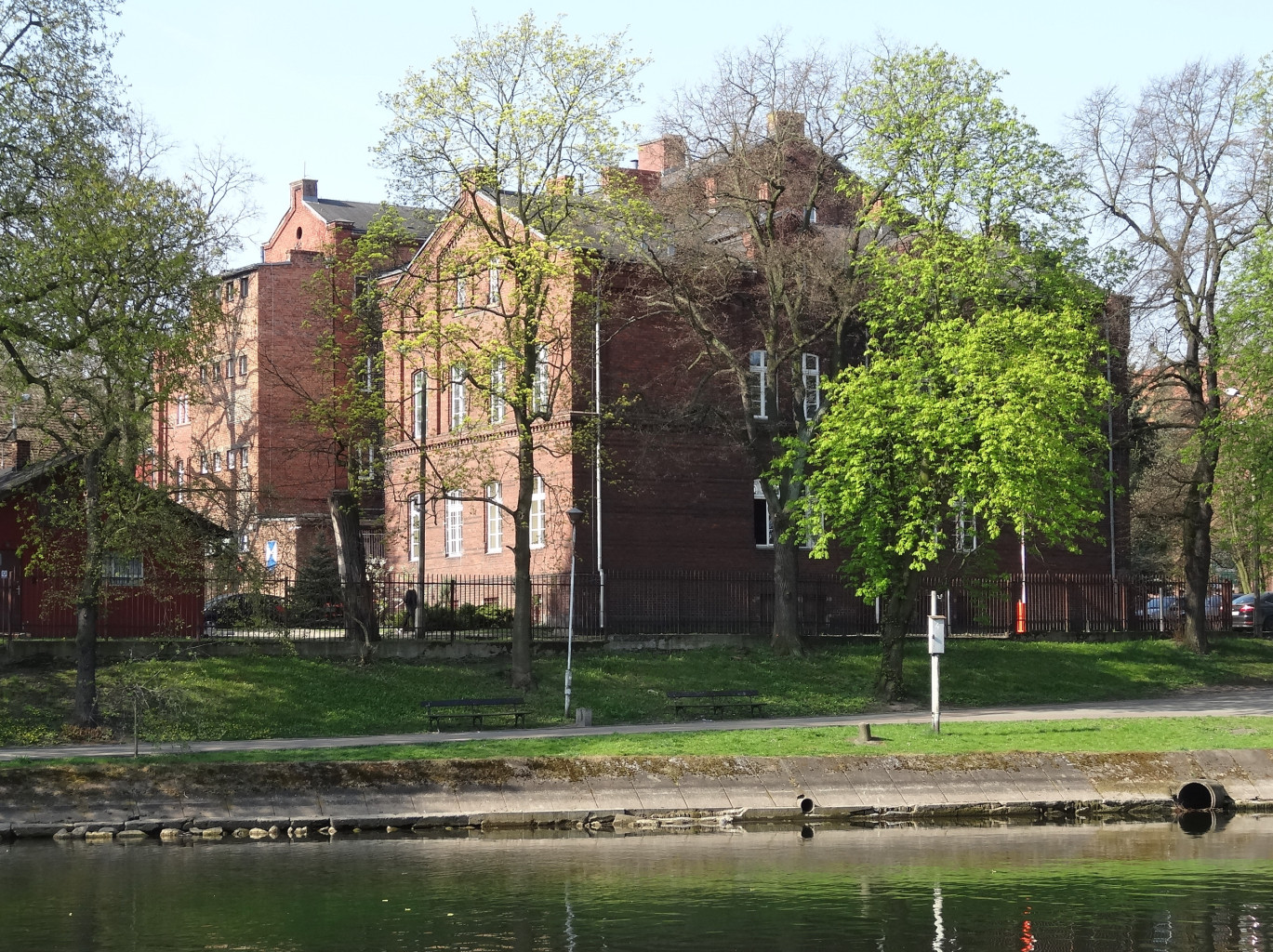
View of the back from Brda river

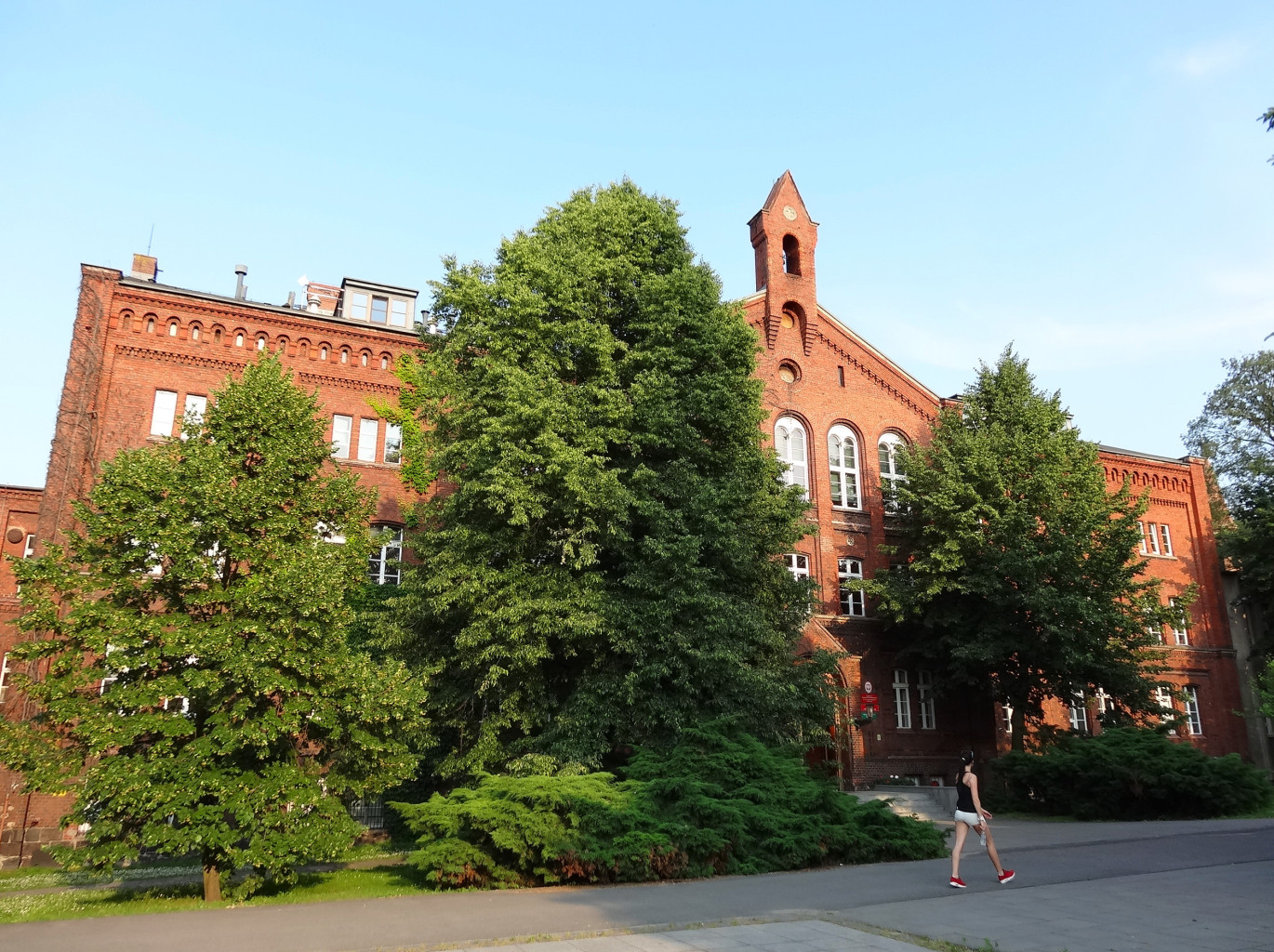
Front elevation from Bernardyńska Street

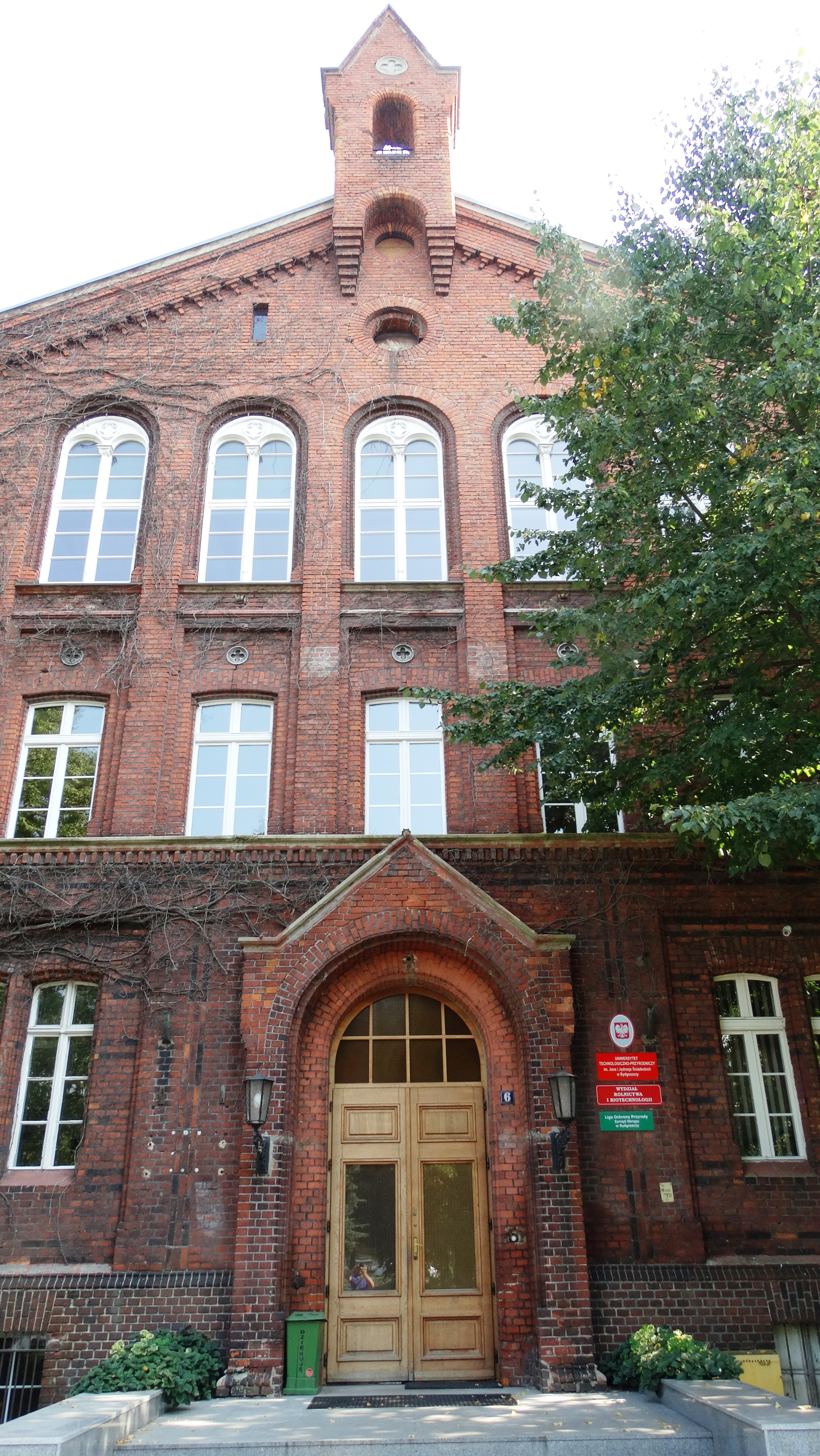
Front avant-corps

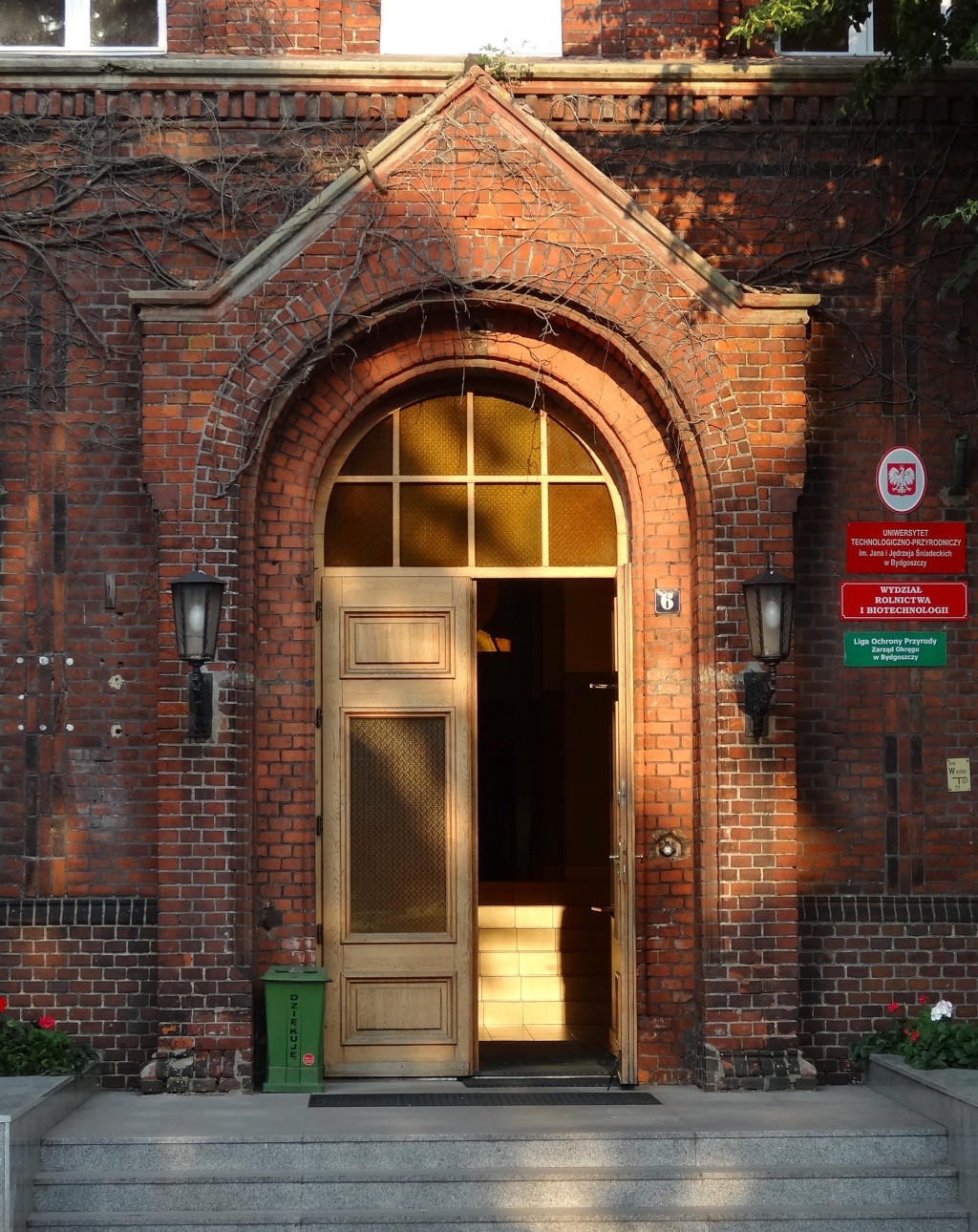
Main gate

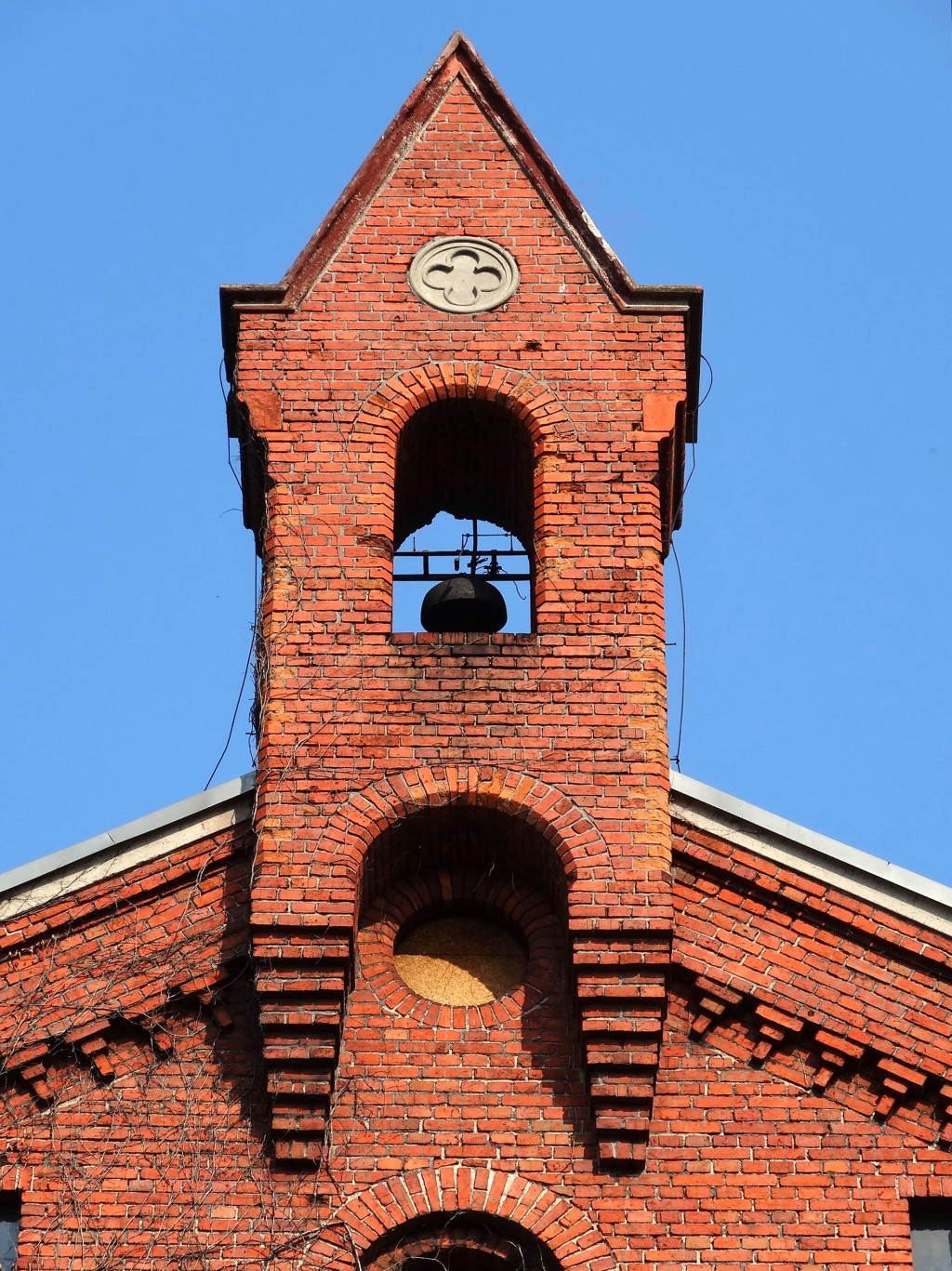
Top of the facade

Monument to the Unknown Greater Poland Insurgent

In 1880, on the front square at 6 was unveiled a War Memorial to commemorate the officers and soldiers who died on the fronts of military campaigns conducted by Kingdom of Prussia (Second Schleswig War in 1864, Austro-Prussian War in 1866 and Franco-Prussian War in 1870–1871).

After 1922, when the Prussian Monument has been demolished, an initiative to commemorate the fallen Polish soldiers in the Greater Poland uprising (1918–1919) in this place took off. The main initiator of the movement was Andrzej Sikorski, a longtime inspector of the Nowofarny Cemetery in Bydgoszcz. To this end, a tomb of the "Unknown Greater Poland Insurgent" was arranged, which contained the ashes of an unidentified fighter insurgent who fall in June 1919, in a military hospital in Bydgoszcz. In the following years, state ceremonies and commemorations were held at the grave. On October 8, 1928, an urn was brought with soil taken from the soldier's graves of Haller's Army in St. Hilaire, France. The tomb was excavated and liquidated by the Nazis in 1939.

After World War II, the grave was unveiled officially a second time on August 25, 1946. However, veterans' circles launched an initiative to erect a real monument at this very place. It was eventually inaugurated on December 29, 1986, on the 68th anniversary of the Greater Poland Uprising, based on a design by Stanisław Horno-Popławski and realized-cast by Aleksander Dętkoś, one of his student from Bydgoszcz.

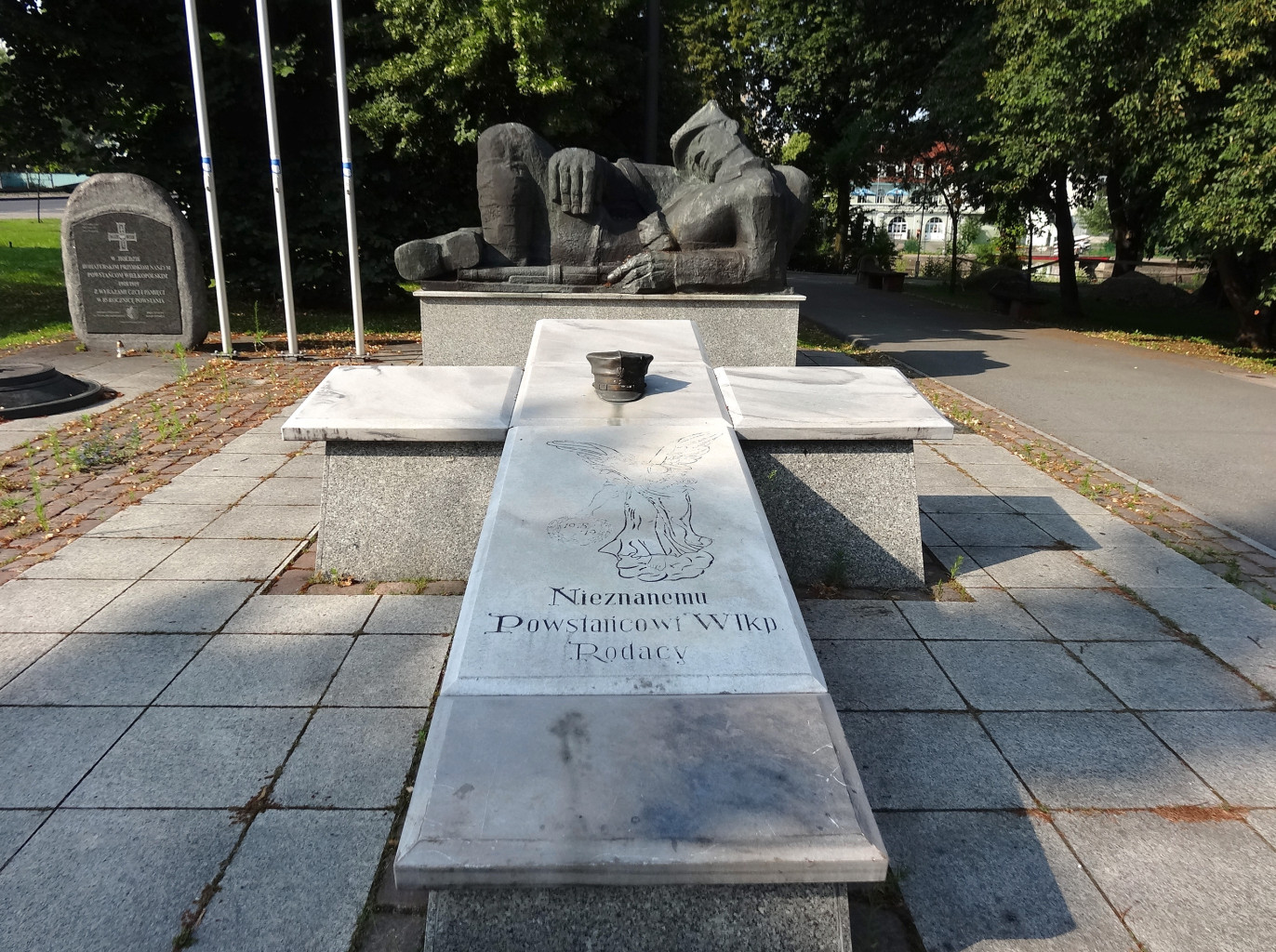
Monument to the fallen (1986)

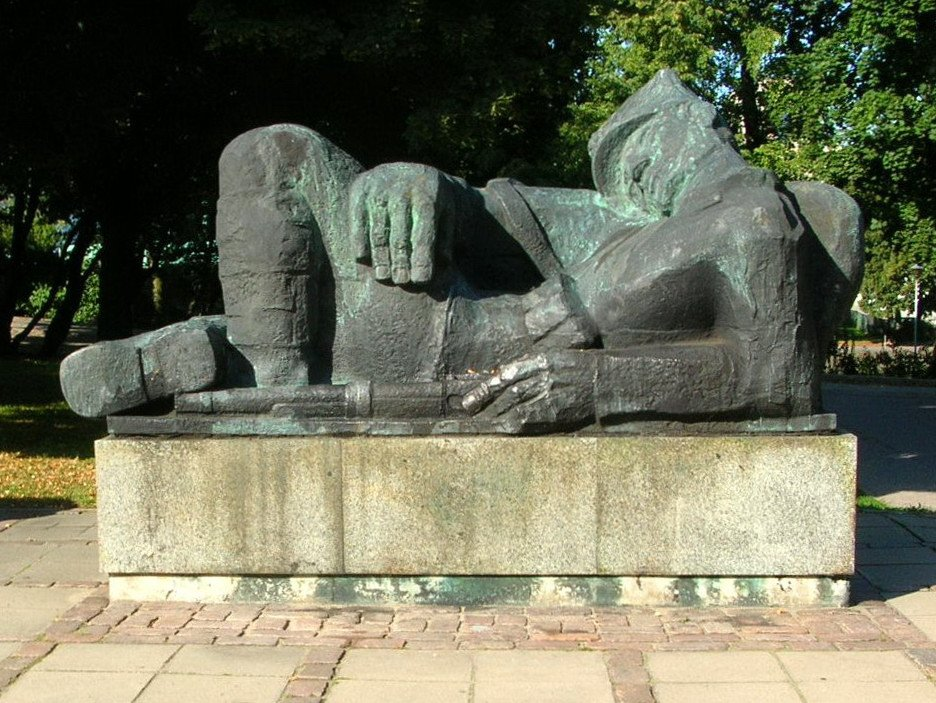
View of the sculpture

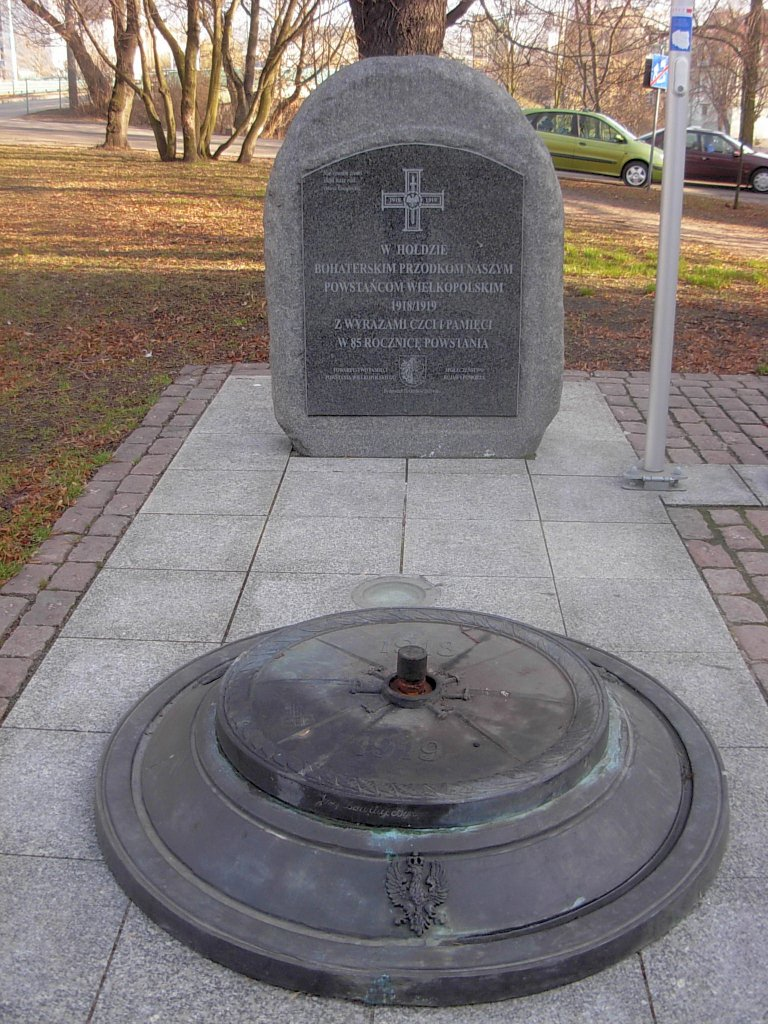
Eternal flame and commemorative plaque adjacent to the monument

Bernardyński Bridge

1872

The construction of the bridge was planned to relieve the bridge of the old town, linking the old marketplace (Polish: Stary Rynek) to the Theatre square. Works started in 1867, with the necessity to realize a one-span bridge that does not hinder water navigation on the river. The roadway had a width of 7.32, with a pedestrian way, based on cantilever beams. The steel bridge had two arched lattice girders, it was lit by four gas lamps standing on each side. The building was complete in 1872 under the name Kaiserbrücke, referring to William I, emperor of Germany and king of Prussia.

At the beginning of the 20th century, part of the renovation of the Wisła-Oder waterway required to rebuild the bridge to meet the constrains of modern shipping: it was necessary to raise the structure above the water by 60 cm. The new bridge thus was re-opened in 1903 and has stood till the outbreak of World War II. It has been blown up on September 4, 1939, by Polish sappers from the 62nd Infantry Regiment in order to prevent German forces from crossing the Brda. Provisionally rebuilt by Germans in autumn 1939, it has been again destroyed by the retreating Nazis on January 22, 1945.

After World War II, remains of the bridge have been extracted from the Brda river and scrapped. From 1945 to 1960, a temporary wooden crossing has been set up, at the same location as today's bridge.

The structure's rebuilding began in 1960, and was completed in 1963. The bridge has been built by overhangs, for the first time in the country by means of movable scaffolding. The designer, Maximilian Wolff received for it the second prize from the Committee for Construction, Urban Planning and Architecture. Bridge has re-opened in December 1963: it had a middle-track line for tramway, dual carriageway road with two lanes each and sidewalks for pedestrians. Partial repair occurred in 1968, a full overhaul in 2000. Since 2005, the structure is illuminated by night.

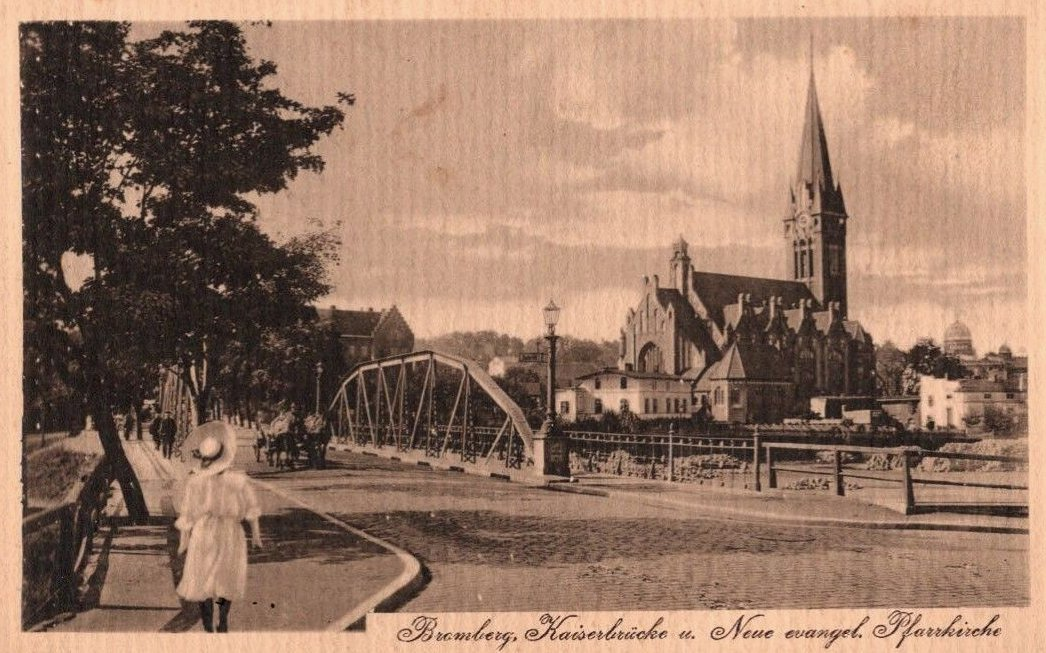
View of Bernardyński bridge in 1910

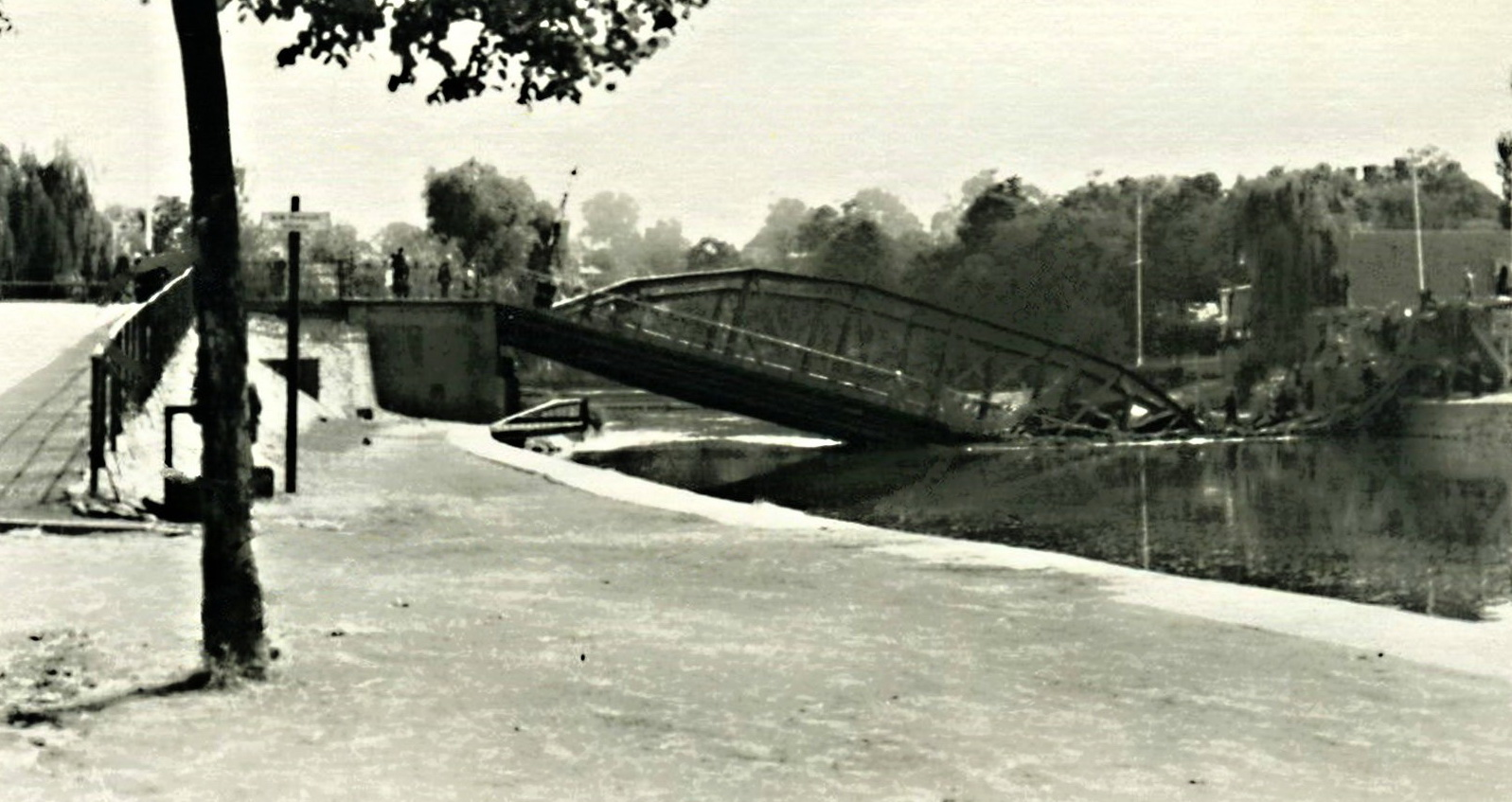
Bernardynski bridge destroyed in 1940

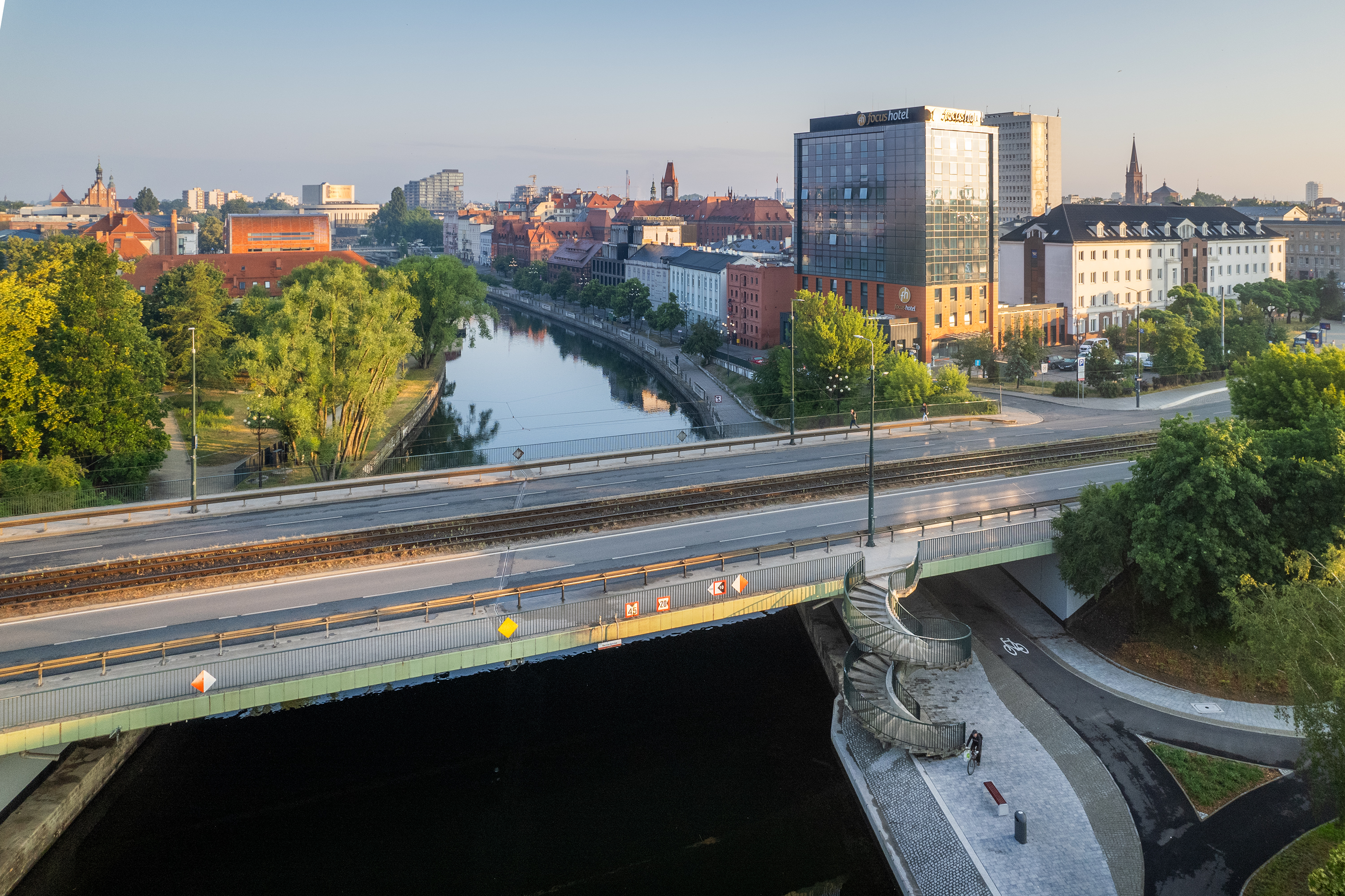
Bird eye view

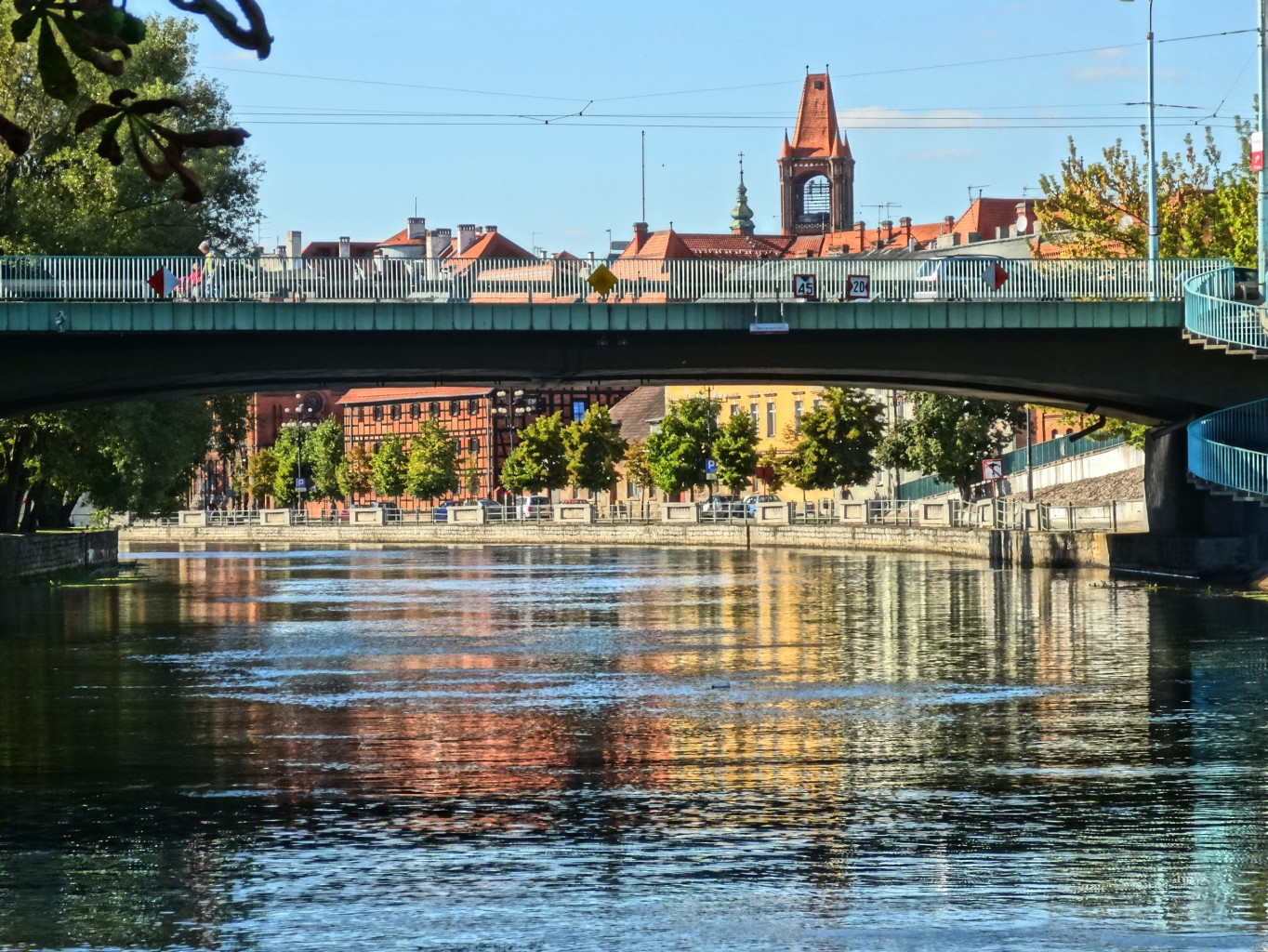
View from the Brda river

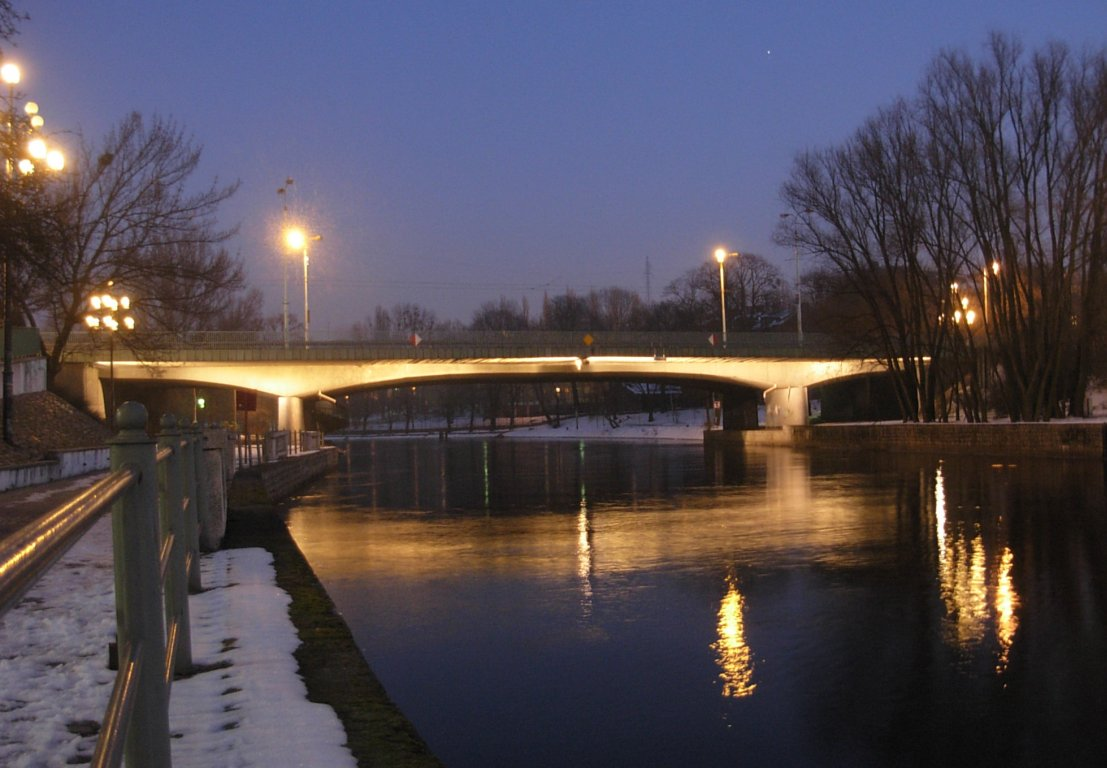
Night illuminations

Old Building of Bydgoszcz Rowing Association

Registered on Kuyavian-Pomeranian Heritage list Nr.601291, Reg.A/1091 (January 18, 1994)

Corner of Bernardyńska Street and Świętego Floriana Street

1914, by Theodore Patzwald

Historicism

The building has been erected by the architect Theodore Patzwald for the German Rowing Club "Frithjof" established in 1894. The club joined from 1923 to 1945 the "Frithjof Rowing Club", a German rowing association. After World War II, the edifice has housed the Bydgoszcz Rowing Association, or BTW (Polish: Bydgoskie Towarzystwo Wioślarskie), born on March 16, 1920, under the name "Tryton Rowing Association" (Polish: Towarzystwo Wioślarzy Tryton Bydgoszcz). In 1996, the building has been sold by municipal authorities to a company, Shanghai Olym-Poland, which set up a hotel and a catering center for Chinese people traveling in Poland and around Europe. In 2010, the building became a hotel with a gastronomic restaurant Zatoka ("The Gulf").

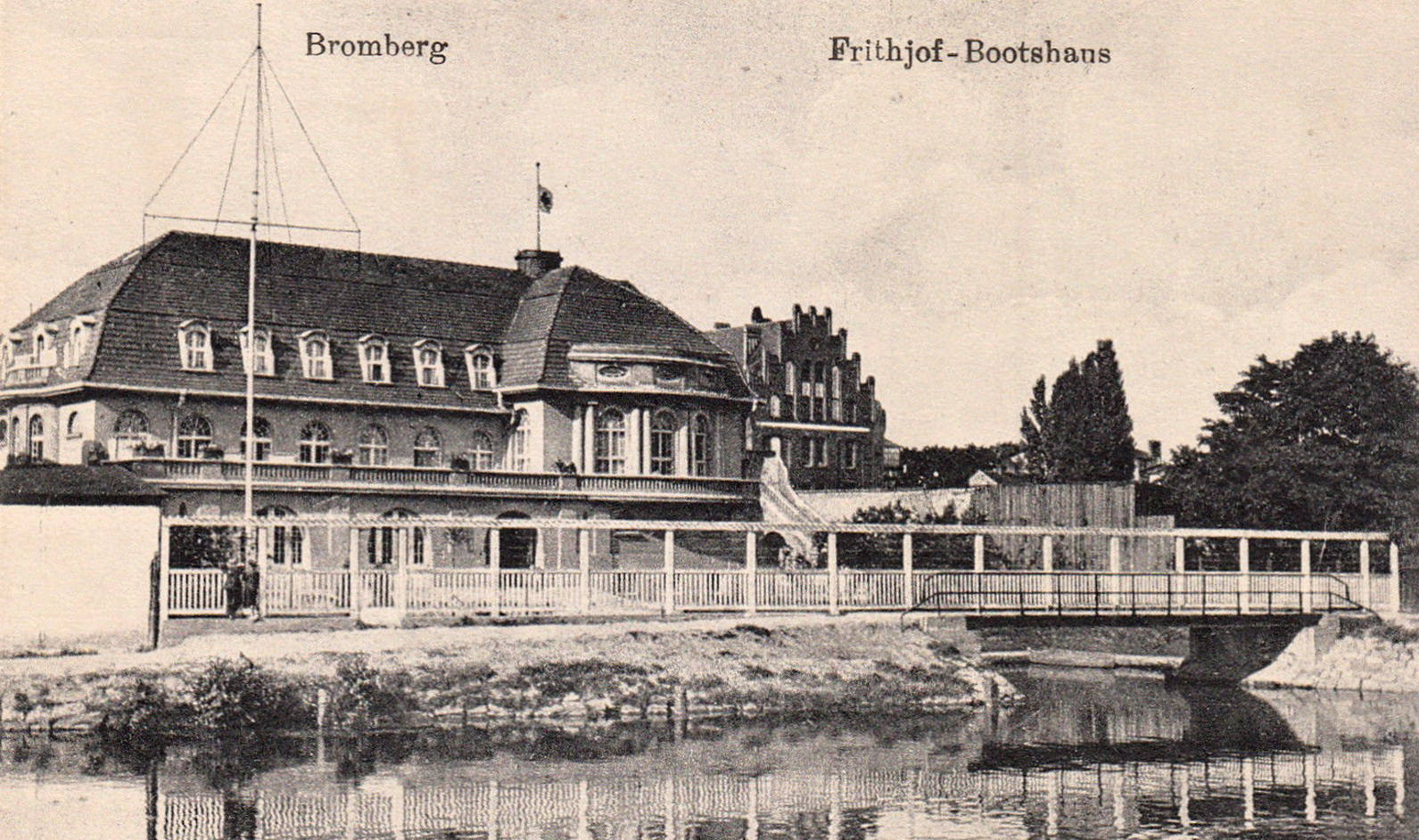
Building of German Rowing Club "Frithjof" 1917

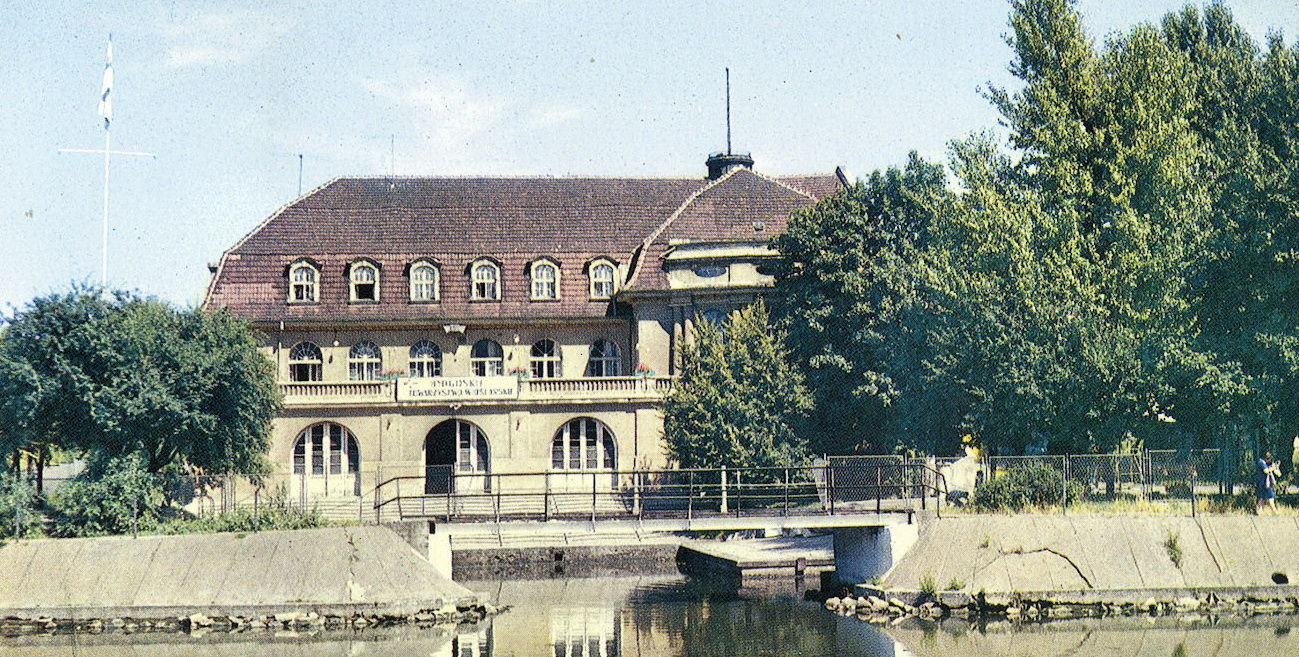
Building of Rowing association "BTW" 1973

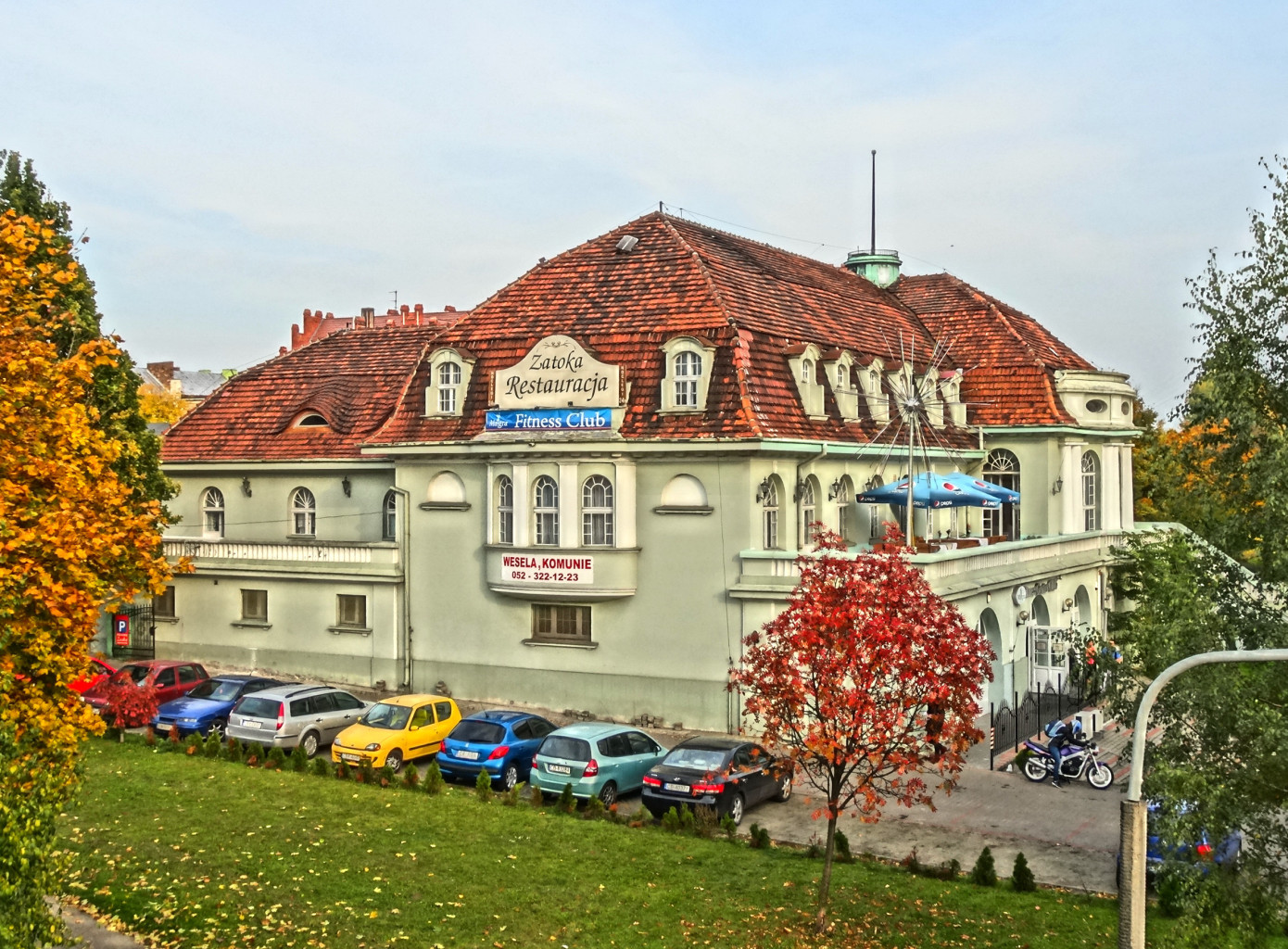
View from Bernardyński Bridge

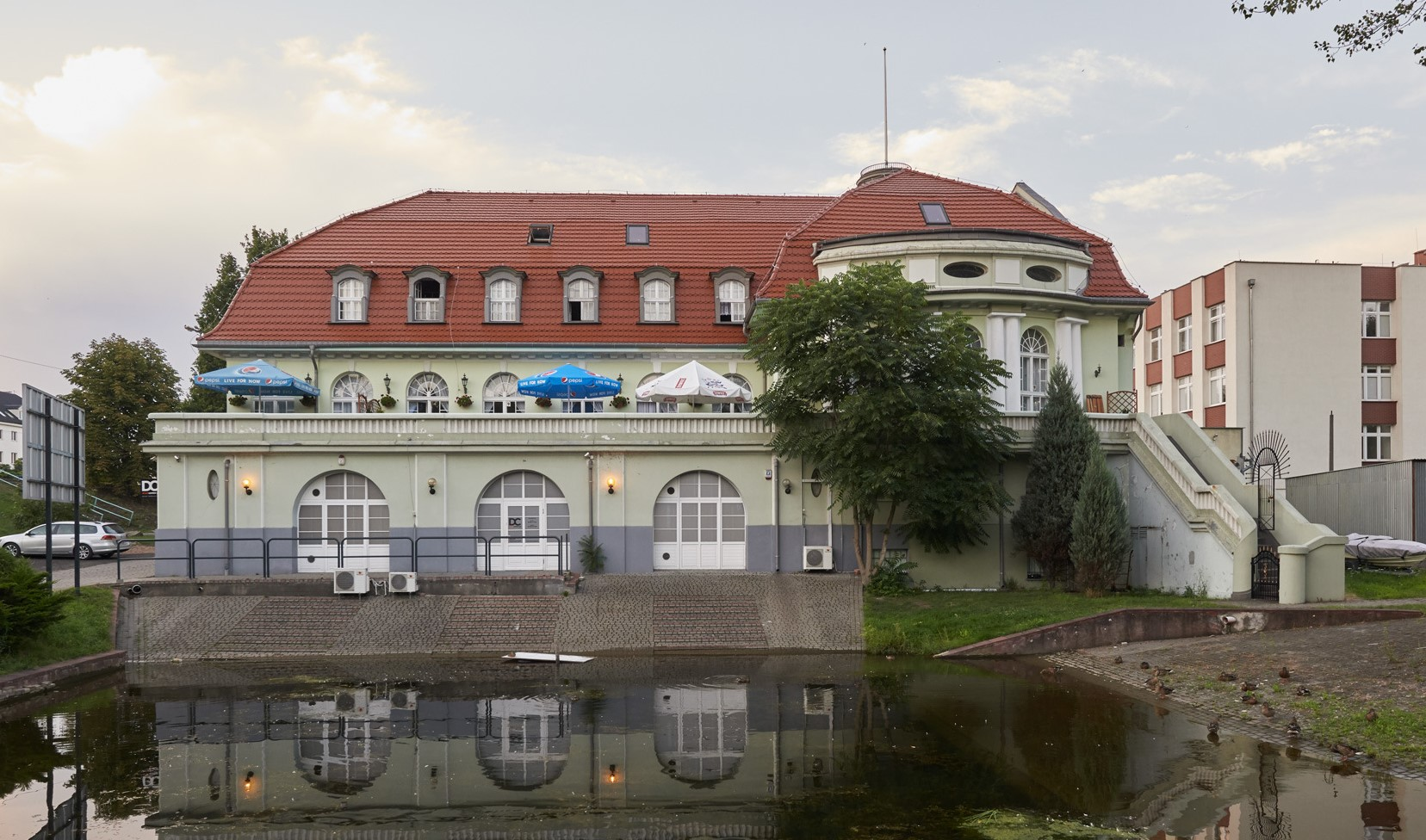
View from Brda river's opposite side

Building at 8 Plac Kościeleckich

Registered on Kuyavian-Pomeranian Heritage list Nr.601370, Reg.A/888 (June 21, 1993)

Corner of Bernardyńska Street and Kościeleckich square

1890, by Carl Meyer

Neo-Gothic

The building was constructed from 1890 to 1892, on a design by architect Carl Meyer. By 1920, it served as the first school for girls ((in German) Erste Mädchen von Volkschule). In 1921, the building housed a Polish primary school K. Piramowicz. It was a 7-class, primary school, for which headmaster in 1925 was Father Smarzyk, and in 1933 Father Menzel. By 1930, it functioned together with the German, evangelical primary school, located in a wing of the building. In 1933 were created two schools of mixed (girls and boys) pupils.

During German occupation, the edifice accommodated for some time a prison, then in 1945 a military hospital. After World War II, it housed primary school Nr.8 Tadeusz Kościuszko. With the school Nr.8 in 2004, and after considering to lodge there city's appeal court, it has been eventually decided to put a Secondary School of Organization and Management. Since 2007, the building also houses the Museum of Freedom and Solidarity in Bydgoszcz.

In 2010, the building has been transferred to the ownership of Bydgoszcz's University "Casimir the Great".

The building's architecture is characteristic of 19th century's public buildings in Bydgoszcz, with references to the neo-gothic and Neo-Romanesque. The designer Carl Meyer has been influenced by the Hanover school of architecture, characterized by brick facades and absence of exterior plaster, decorative sculptures and colored surface. Carl Meyer also realised several other edifices in downtown Bydgoszcz, among others:

- House at Gdanska Street 60;
- House at 6 August Cieszkowski Street;
- Bydgoszcz Water supply station, along with architect Marshall.

The building has a "L" shape with wings, two-storey, a basement and an attic. The elevation is divided by pilasters and adorned with brick-made friezes running under the cornice, like dentils. Avant-corps are topped with crow-stepped gable, typical of Carl Meyer's works.

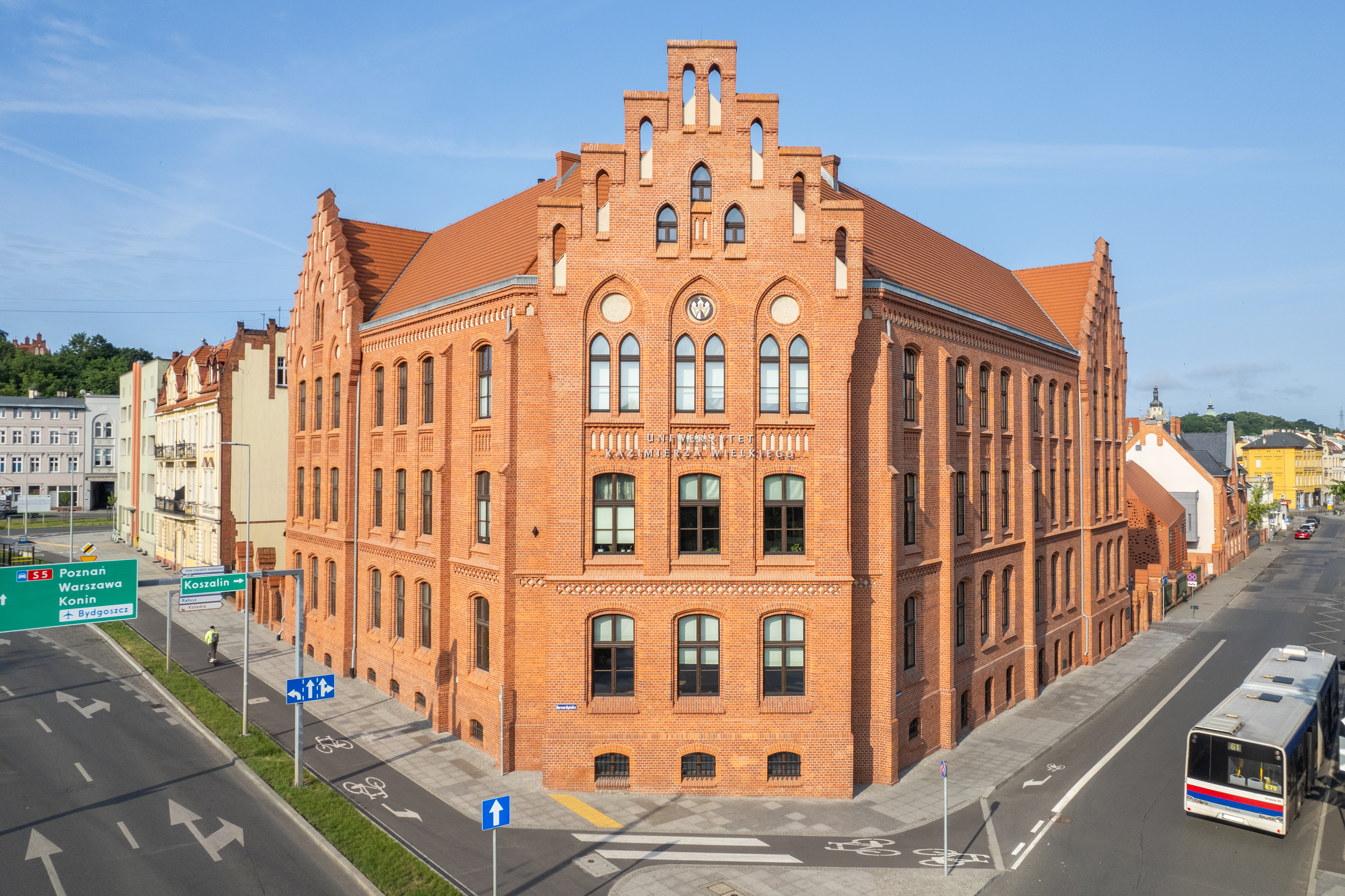
View from Bernardyńska Street

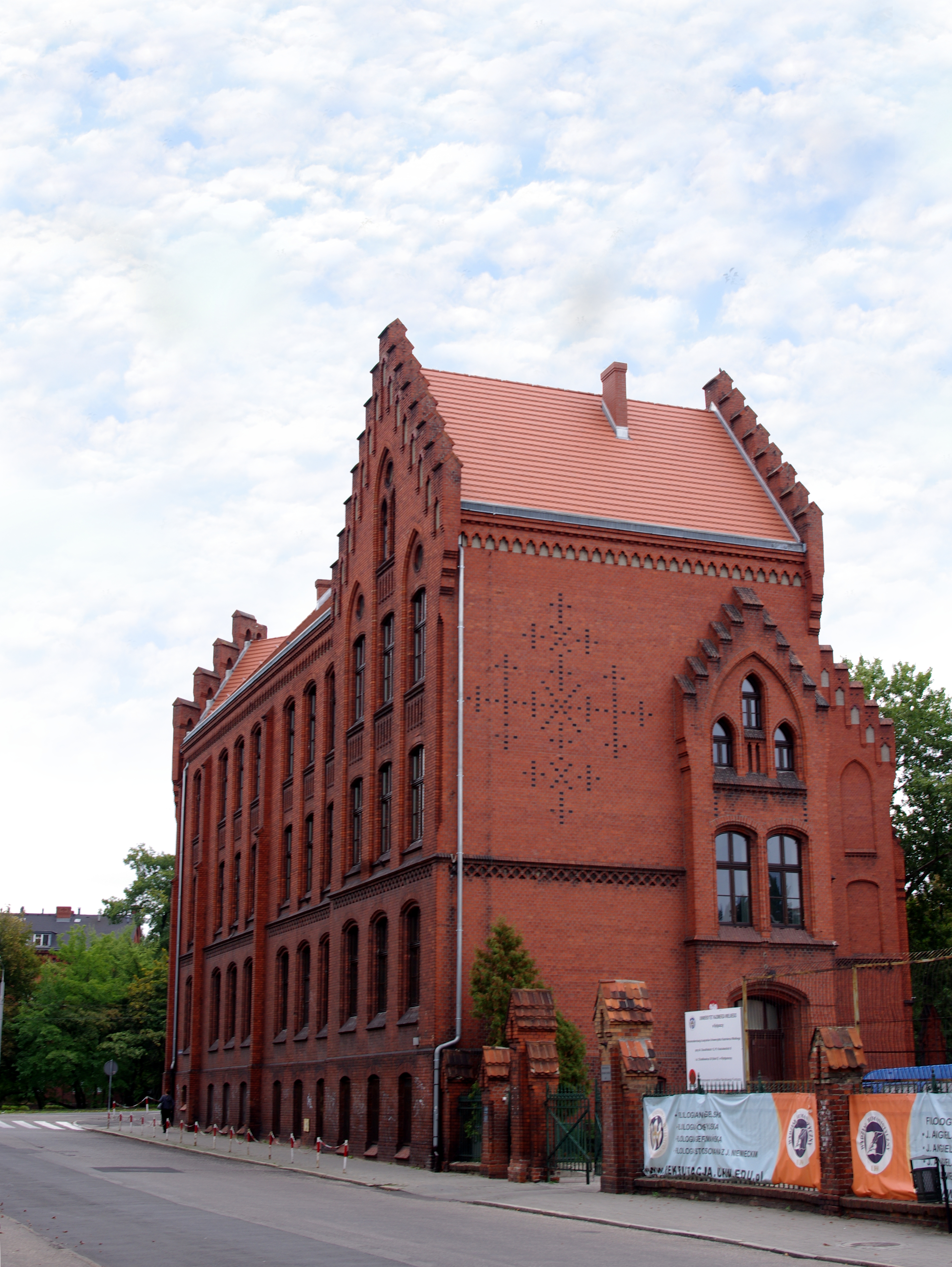
Wing on Kościeleckich square

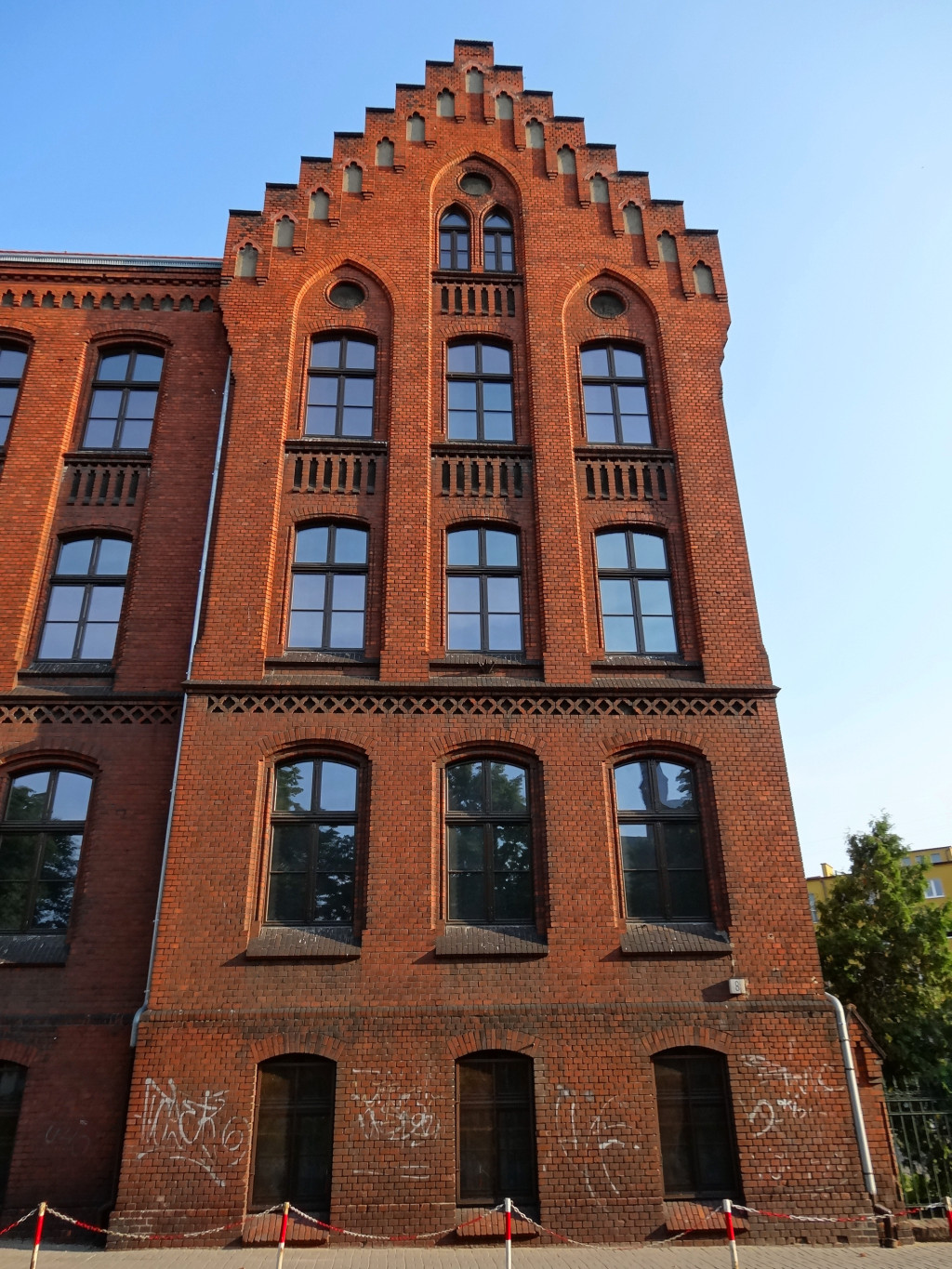
Detail of an avant-corps

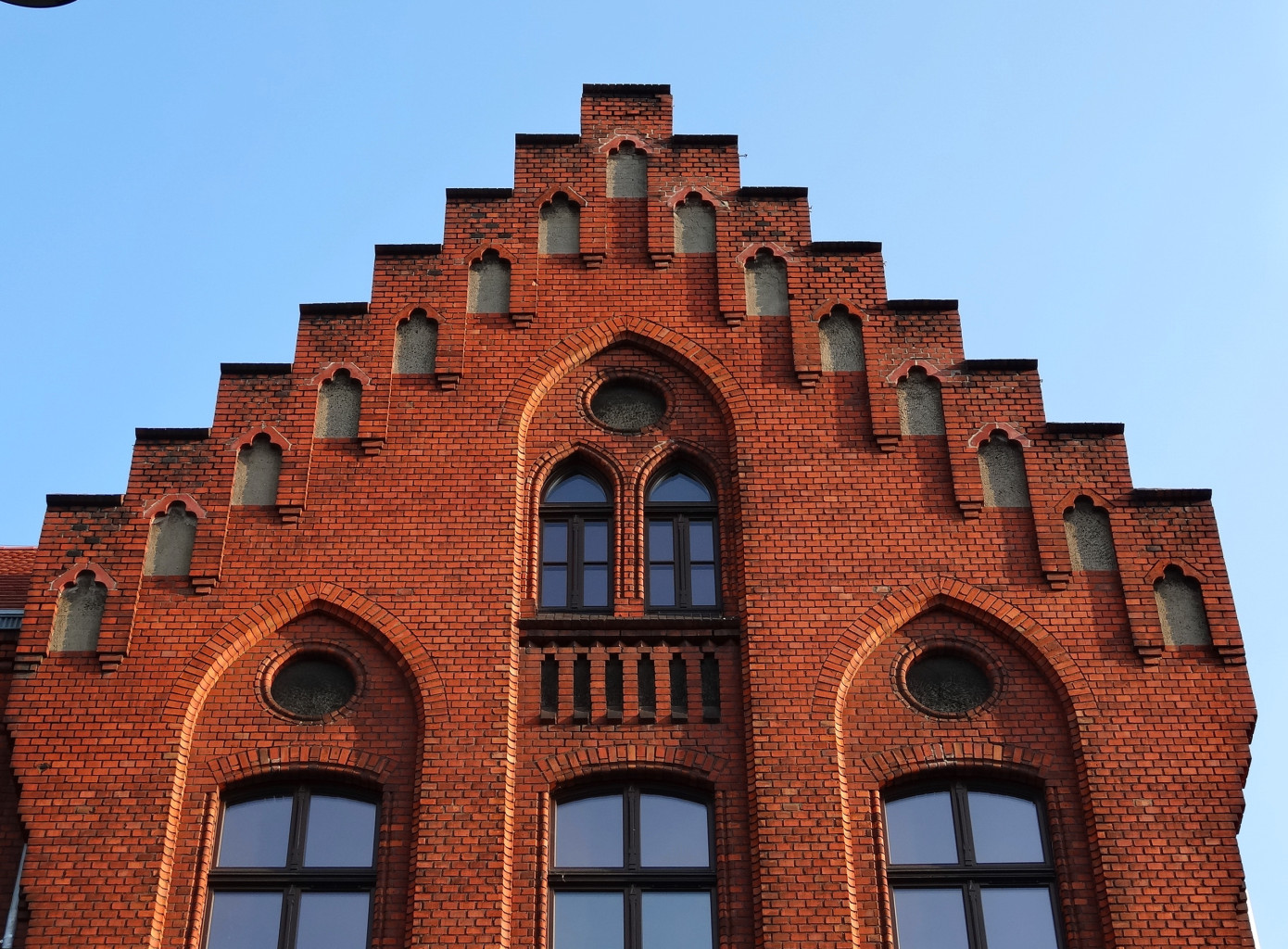
Detail of crow-stepped gable

Holiday Inn Hotel

Grodzka St.36, corner with Bernardyńska Street

2010

Modernism

This 4-star hotel of 138 rooms has been built in 2010 at the eastern tip of Grodzka street.

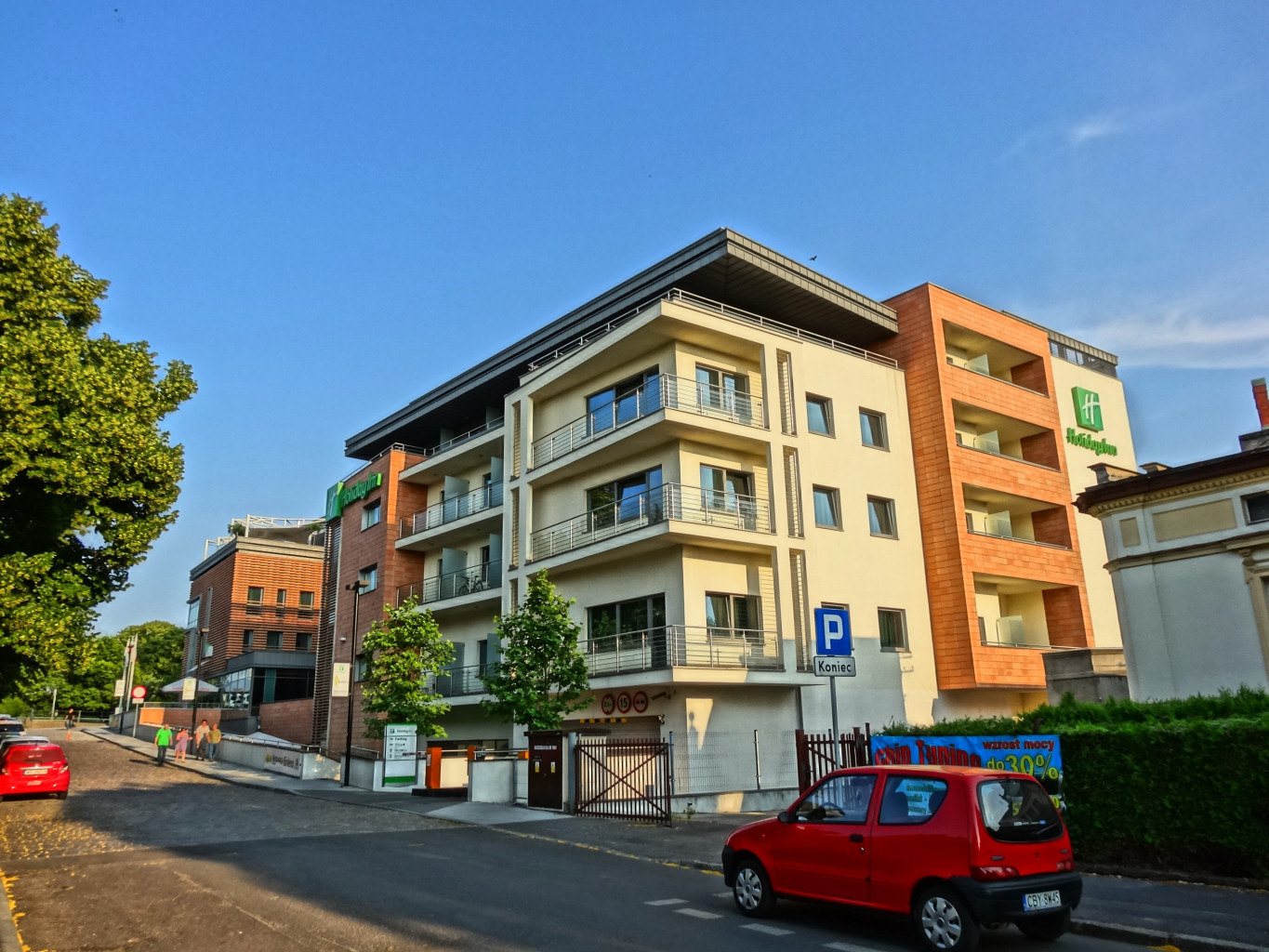
Facade onto Grodzka Street

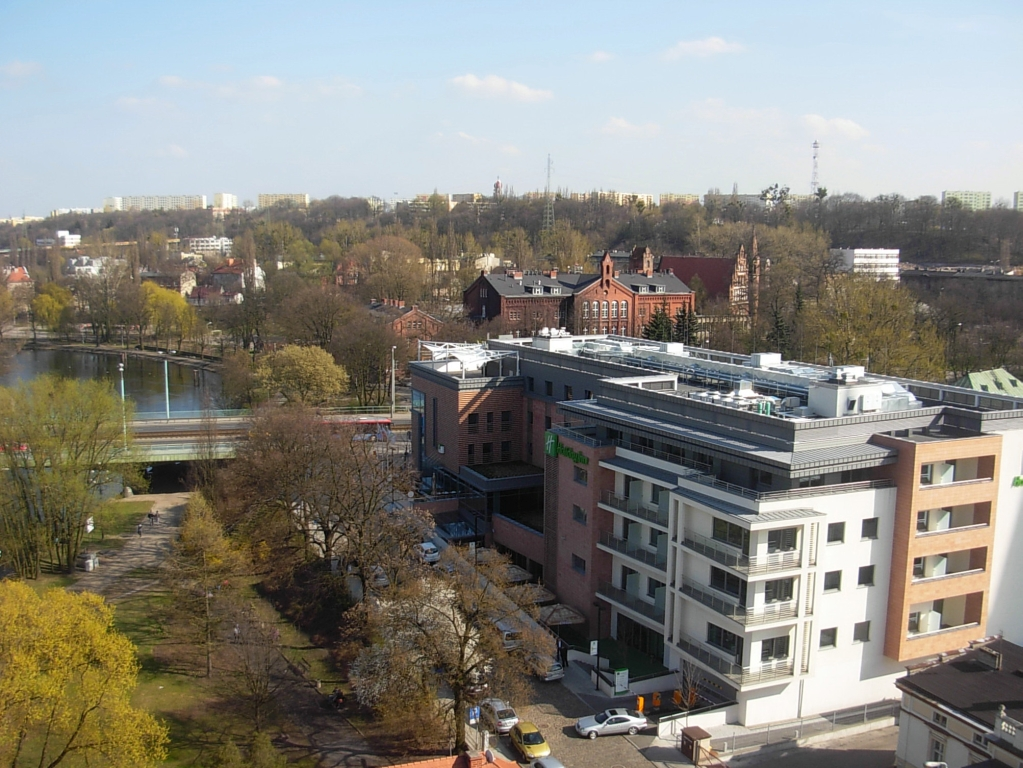
Bird eye view

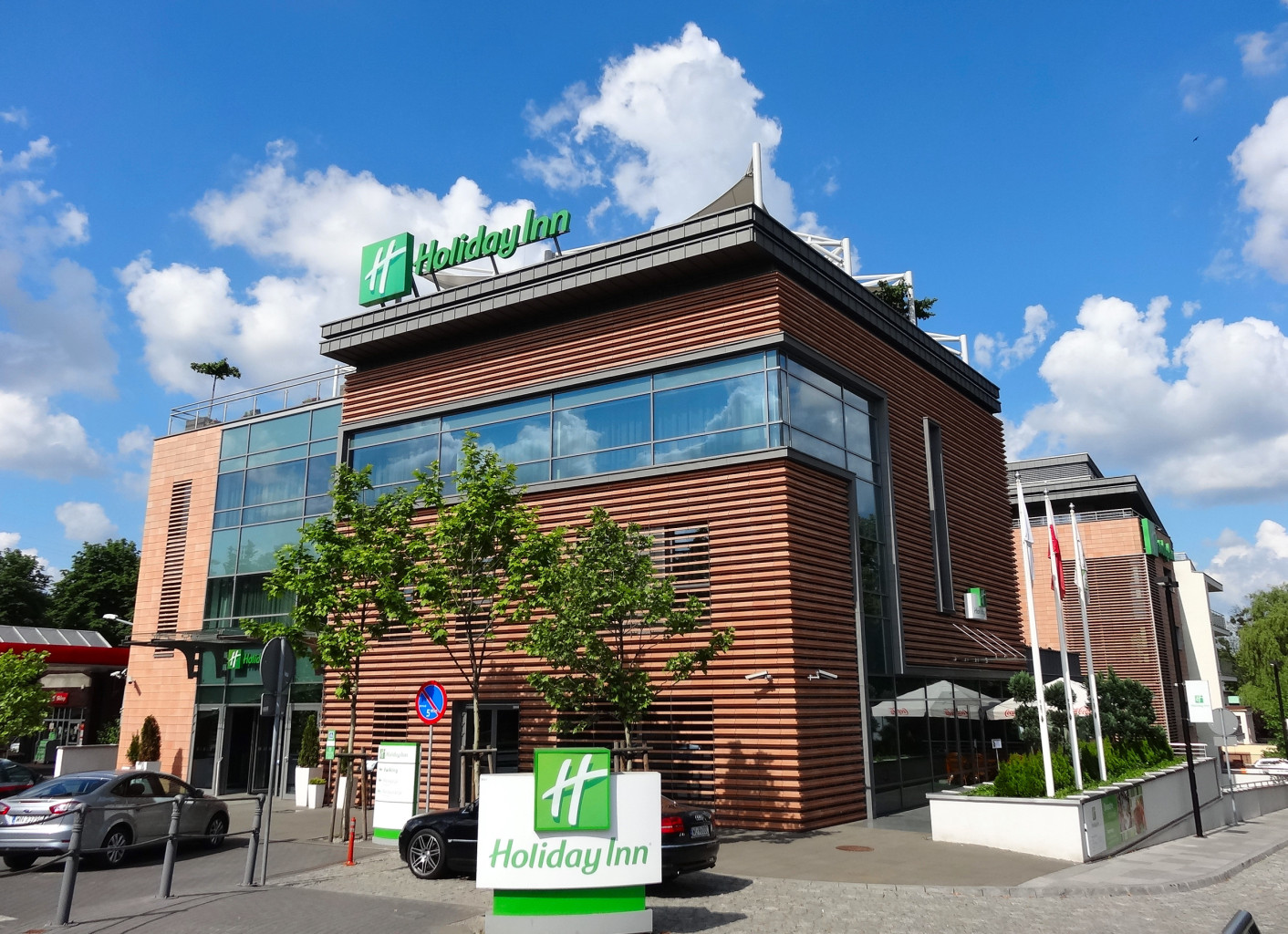
View from Bernardyńska street

Building at 13

1964

Modernism

This office building has been constructed by company Projprzem SA, on a design by project architect Witold Jańczak on the corner of Bernardyńska and Stary Port Street, along the Brda river. It has been thoroughly modernized in 2004. Company Projprzem SA, established in 1948 as an engineering office, has become in 1990 a joint stock company, listed on Warsaw Stock Exchange.

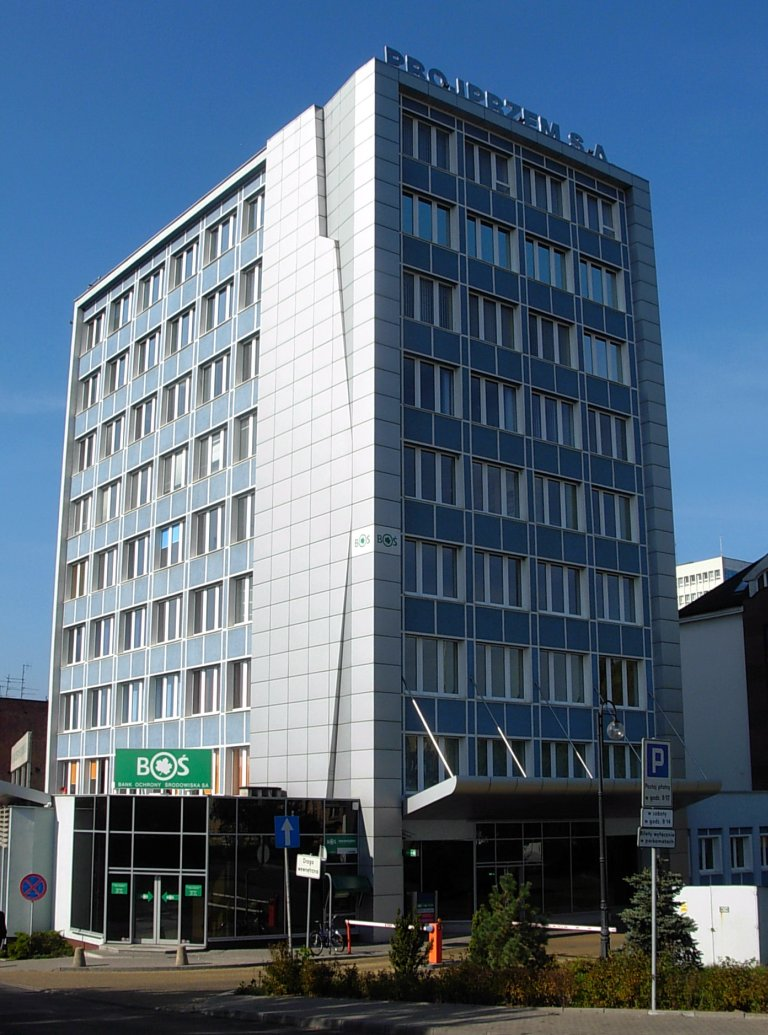
Building view from Bernardyńska street

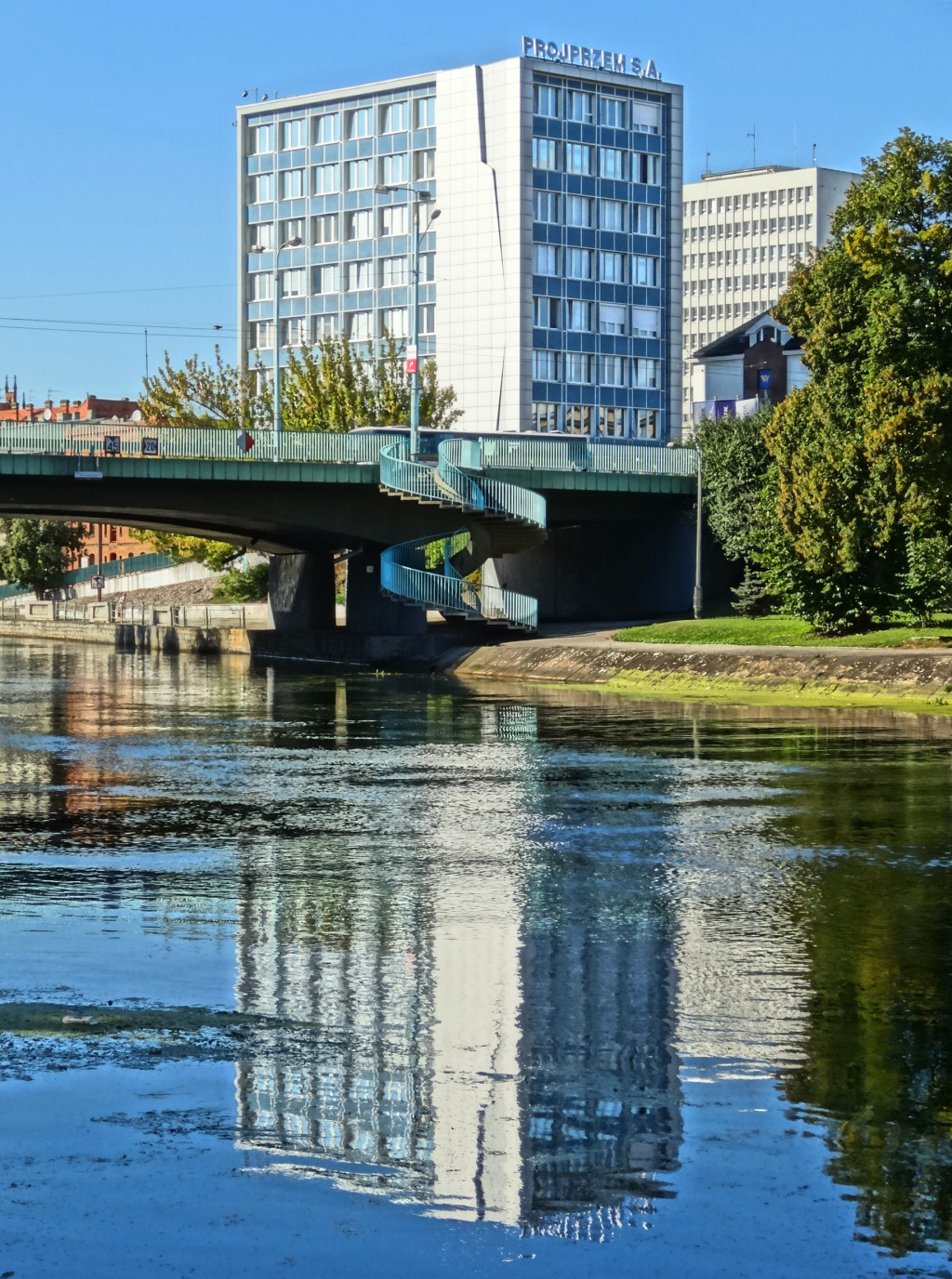
The building with Bernardyński bridge on the foreground

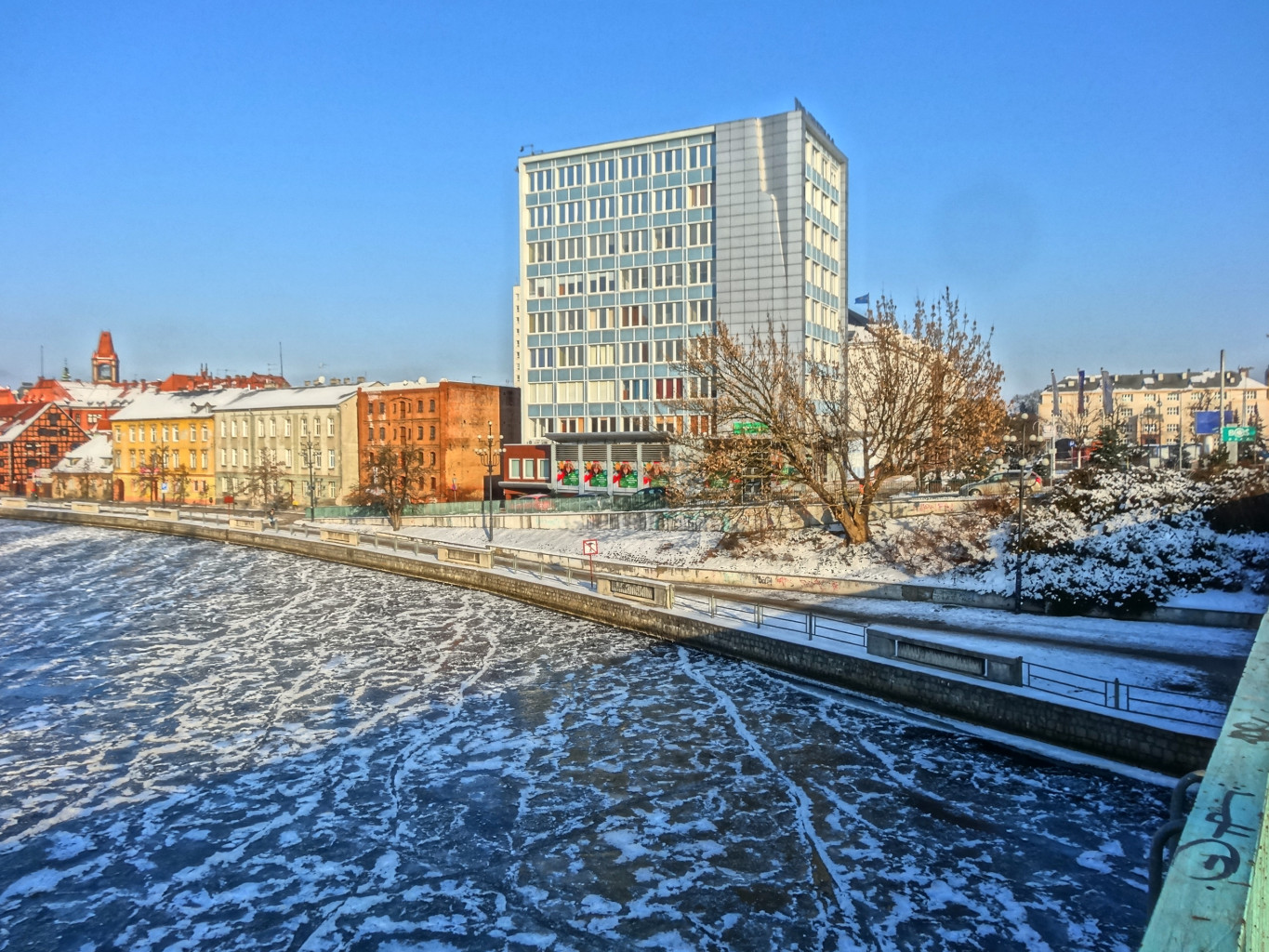
View from Bernardyński bridge

Building at 15

1955

Modernism

The building of the "Computation Centre of Polish Post Office" has been built in the years 1955–1957, and thoroughly modernized between 1994 and 1995. At its birth in 1920, this institution in Bydgoszcz was the Audit Office of Polish Post, covering a range of activities throughout the country. In 1935, its name has been changed to Accounting Chamber of Control of Post and Telecommunications (Polish: Izba Kontroli Rachunkowej Poczty i Telekomunikacji), and 1951 to Central Bureau of Posts and Telegraphs Settlements (Polish: Centralne Biuro Rozrachunkowe Poczt i Telegrafów). Since Polish Post restructuring in 1991, the building in Bydgoszcz houses an organizational unit of the company.

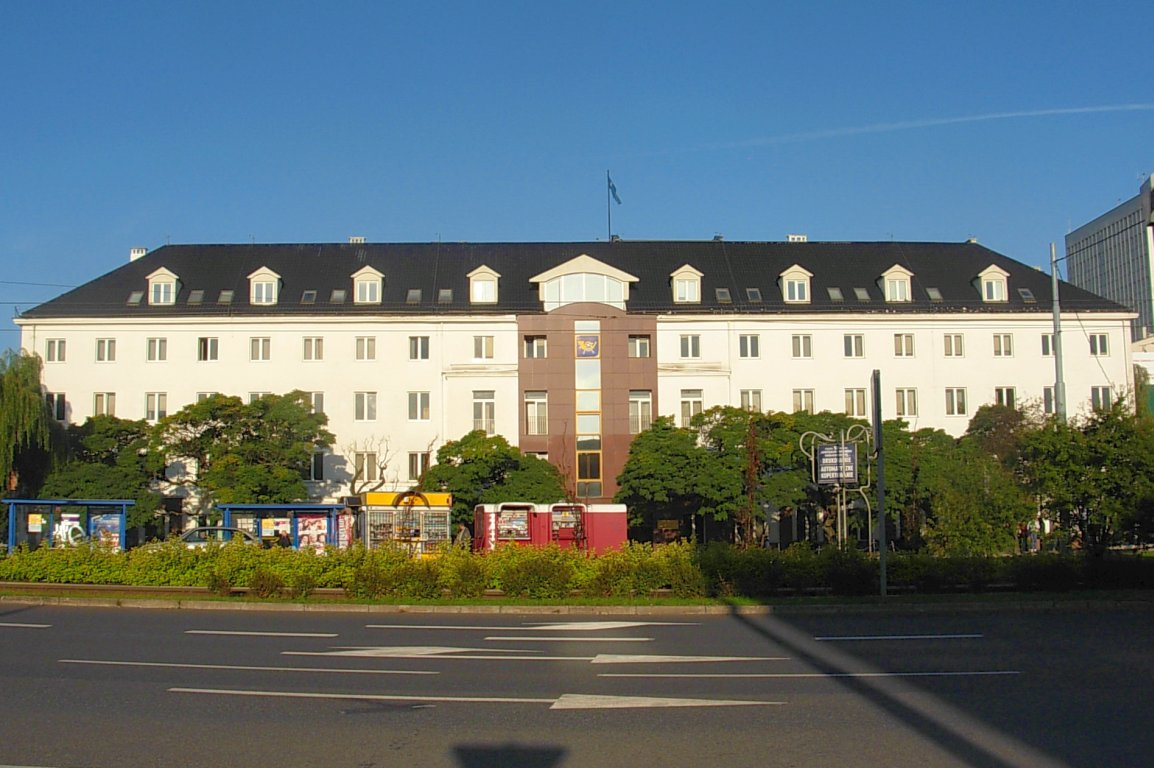
View of main elevation from Bernardyńska Street

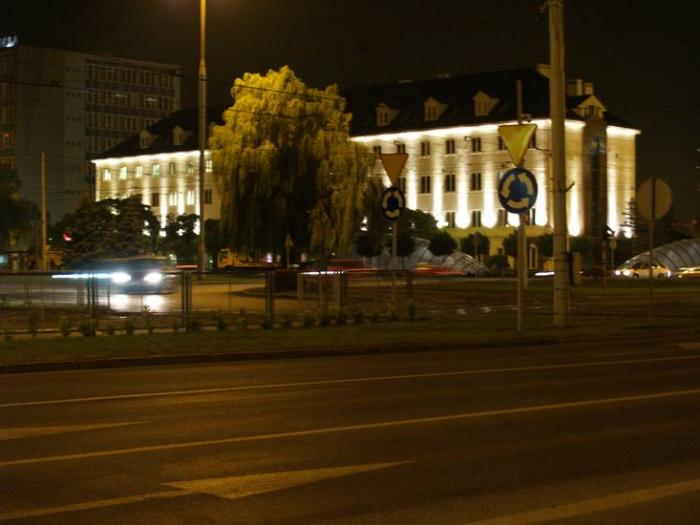
By night from Bernardinska roundabout

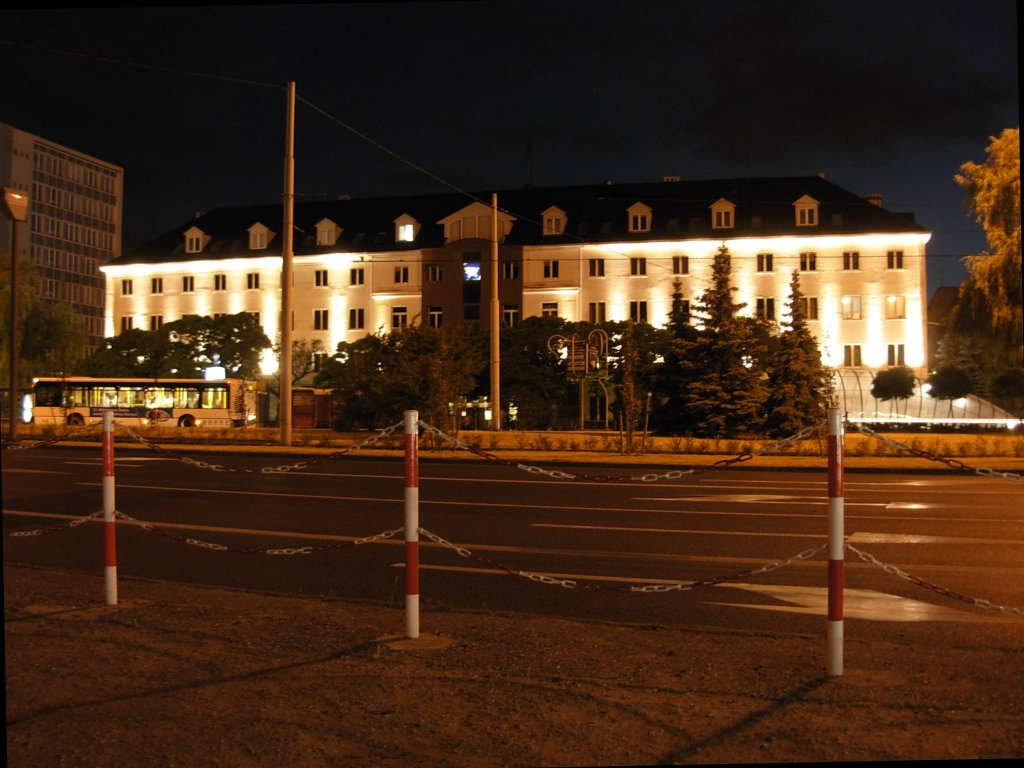
Main facade by night

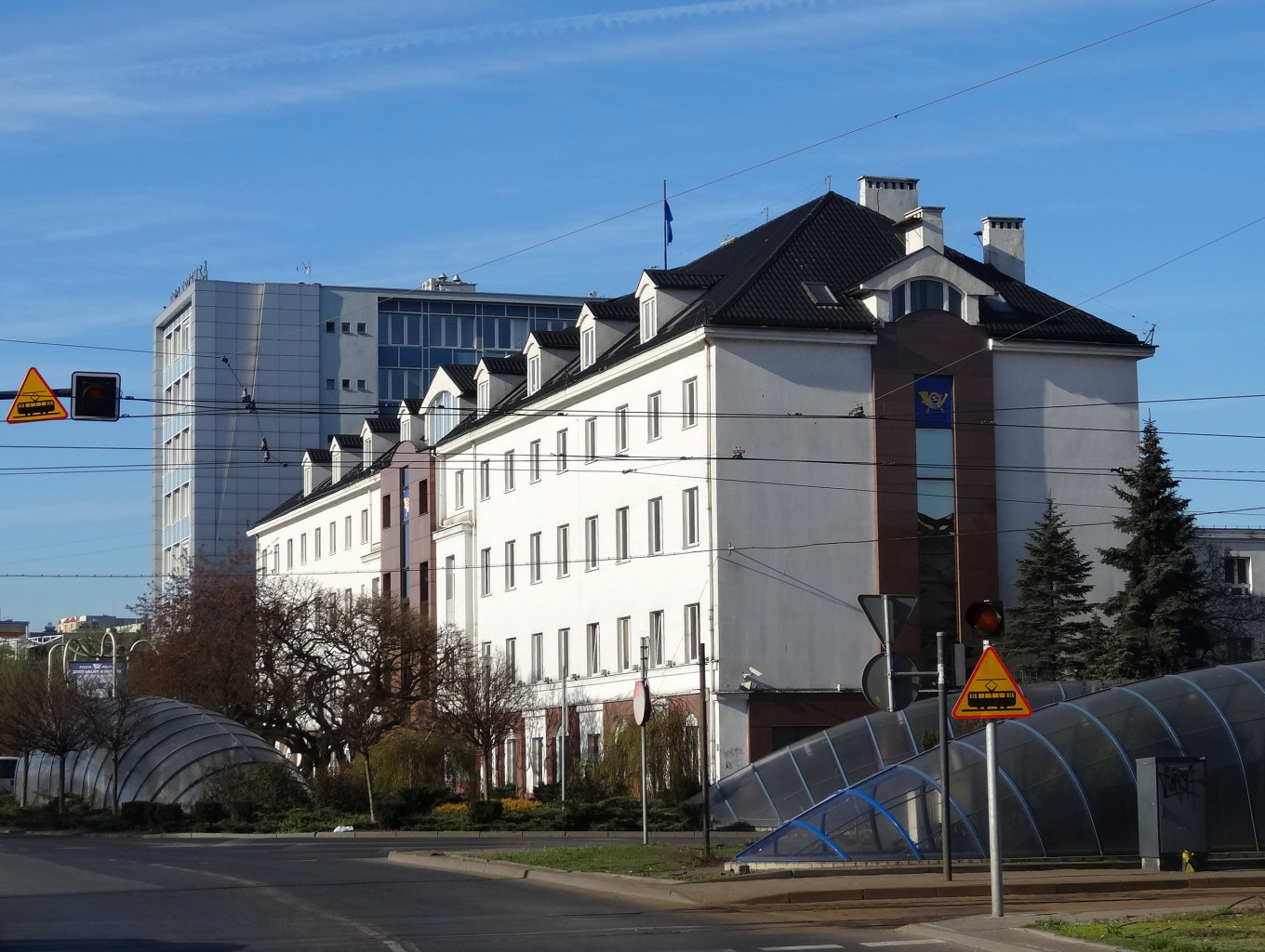
View from Bernardinska roundabout

== Bibliography ==
- Biskup, Marian (1991). Historia Bydgoszczy. Tom I do roku 1920 (in Polish). Warsaw–Poznań: Bydgoskie Towarzystwo Naukowe.
- Iłowski, Henryk (2001). Geniusz loci bernardynów bydgoskich. Kalendarz Bydgoski (in Polish). Bydgoszcz: Towarzystwo Miłośników Miasta Bydgoszczy.
- Klasztory bernardyńskie w Polsce w jej granicach historycznych. Praca zbiorowa pod red. Ks. Hieronima Eug. Wyczawskiego OFM (in Polish). Kalwaria Zebrzydowska: Wydawnictwo Bernardynów "Calvarianum". 1985. pp. 35–40.
- Łbik, Lech (1999). Narodziny bydgoskiej parafii, średniowieczne świątynie, parafialny laikat, dekanat. Kronika Bydgoska – tom specjalny wydany z okazji wizyty papieża Jana Pawła II w Bydgoszczy (in Polish). Bydgoszcz: Towarzystwo Miłośników Miasta Bydgoszczy.
- Zajączkowska, Tamara (2001). Tajemnice krypty klasztornej – czyli o interesujących odkryciach archeologicznych w kościele garnizonowym pod wezwaniem Najświętszej Marii Panny Królowej Pokoju w Bydgoszczy. Materiały do dziejów kultury i sztuki Bydgoszczy i regionu. Zeszyt 6 (in Polish). Bydgoszcz: Pracownia dokumentacji i popularyzacji zabytków wojewódzkiego ośrodka kultury w Bydgoszczy.
- Parucka, Krystyna (2008). Zabytki Bydgoszczy – minikatalog (in Polish). Bydgoszcz: "Tifen" Krystyna Parucka. ISBN 9788392719106.
- Umiński, Janusz (1996). Bydgoszcz (in Polish). Bydgoszcz: Regionalny Oddział PTTK "Szlak Brdy".
- Derenda, Jerzy (2006). Piękna stara Bydgoszcz – tom I z serii Bydgoszcz miasto na Kujawach. Praca zbiorowa (in Polish). Bydgoszcz: Towarzystwo Miłośników Miasta Bydgoszczy.
- Kajczuk, Jacek (1996). Mosty i wiadukty (in Polish). Bydgoszcz: Bydgoska Gospodarka Komunalna.
- Licznerski, Alfons (1976). Trudności budowy ul. Bernardyńskiej w latach 1855-1875. Kalendarz Bydgoski (in Polish). Bydgoszcz: Towarzystwo Miłośników Miasta Bydgoszczy. pp. 81–86.
- Michalski, Stanisław (1988). Bydgoszcz wczoraj i dziś 1945-1980 (in Polish). Warsaw–Poznań: Państwowe Wydawnictwo Naukowe.
- Dudek, Krzysztof (2012). Monografia mostów województwa kujawsko-pomorskiego. Brda i Kanał Bydgoski. Tom II z serii: Mosty z biegiem rzek (in Polish). Bydgoszcz – Grudziądz: Związek Mostowców Rzeczypospolitej Polskiej Oddział Pomorsko-Kujawski. ISBN 9788393416028.
