= Podwale Street, Bydgoszcz =

Street in Bydgoszcz, Poland

Coordinates: 53.1213°N 18.0021°E

Podwale Street
Bydgoszcz
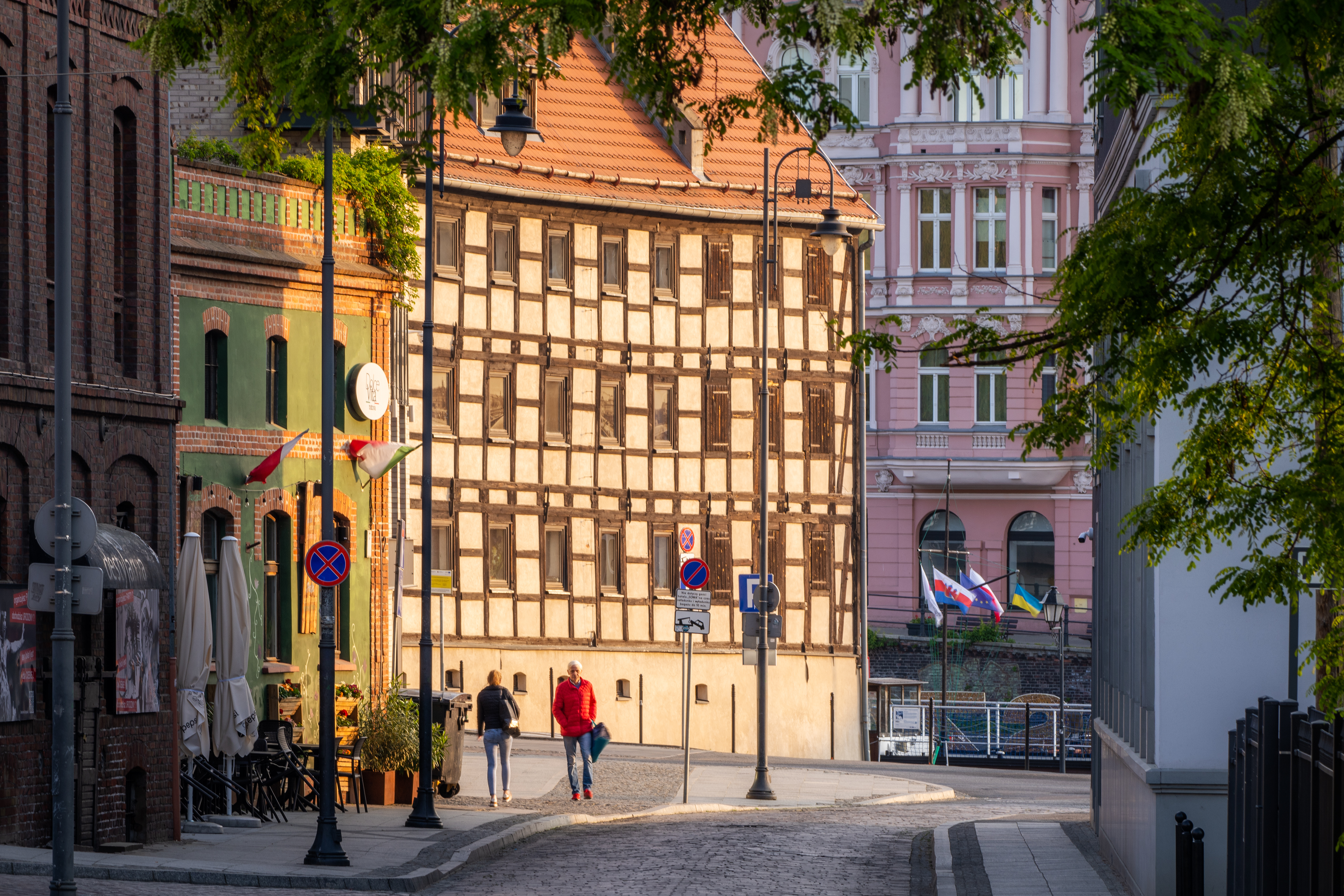
- View of the street

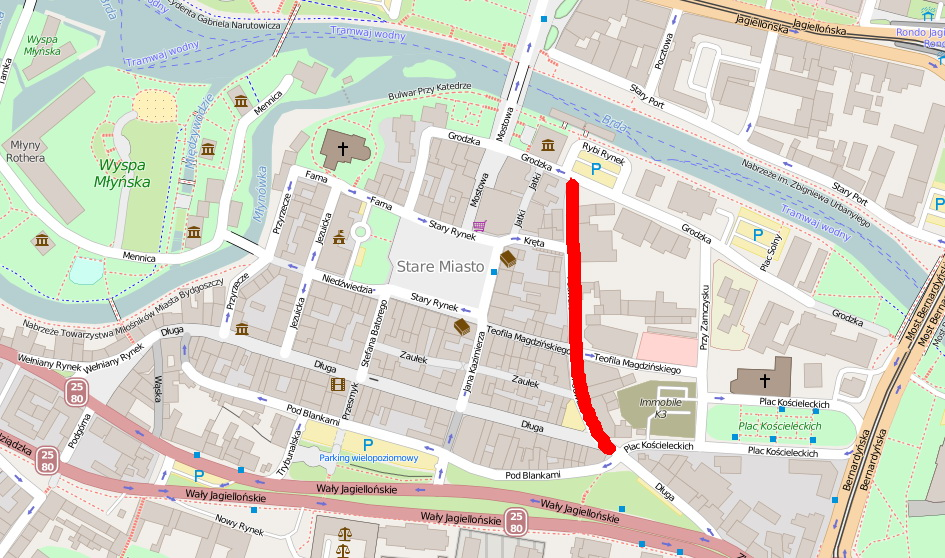
- Location of Podwale Street in Bydgoszcz
- Native name: Ulica Podwale (Polish)
- Former name: Wallstraße
- Part of: Bydgoszcz Old town district
- Namesake: Under the rampart (pod-wał)
- Owner: City of Bydgoszcz
- Length: 230 m (750 ft)
- Location: Bydgoszcz, Poland

Podwale street is a historic path of Bydgoszcz old town.

== Location ==
The street is located in the eastern part of the Old Town. It extends approximately on a north–south axis, from the Grodzka Street to Długa Street. It is 230m long.

== Naming ==
The street section has borne the following names:

- 16th century to the first half of 18th century - "Platea dicta Frog", "Wałowa" ("Embankment")
- 1800-1920 - Wallstraße
- 1920-1939 - Podwale
- 1939-1945 - Wallstraße
- From 1945 - Podwale

The name refers to the alleged fortification, Polish: wał, "rampart", located on the east side of the street, along the castle moat, part of fortifications of the city.

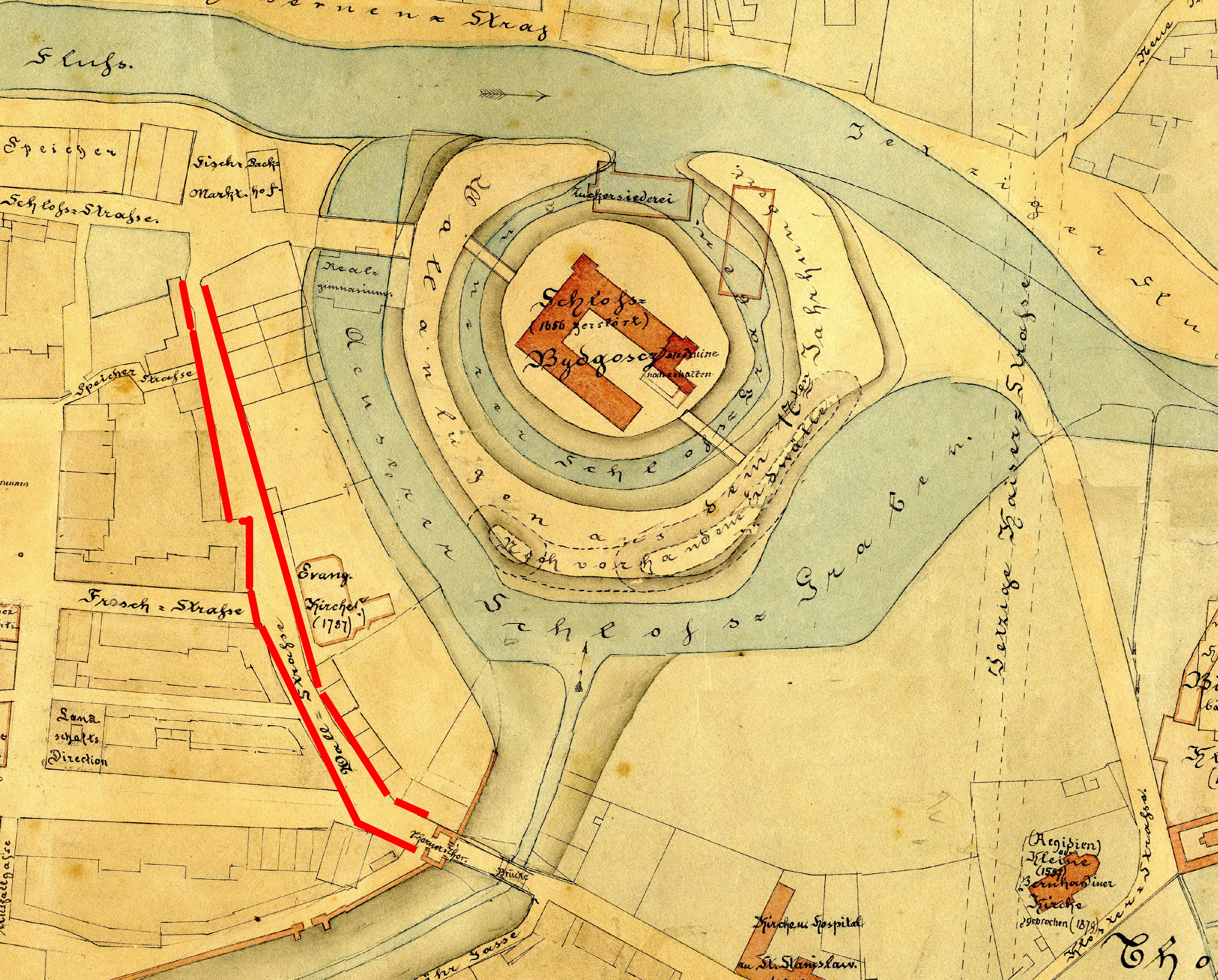
Podwale Street ("Wall strasse") on a 16th-century map of Bydgoszcz, reconstituted in 1890

== History ==
Podwale Street was laid out in the middle of the 14th century, during the formation of the old town of Bydgoszcz. The path has been following the location of the castle moat, on the eastern edge of the city: in fact, it marks the delineation between the ancient city charter and the early medieval castle. At this place, king Casimir III the Great approved, in the mid-14th century, the construction of the Starostwo Castle.

During the archaeological searches carried out in the area Podwale street (at the intersection with Grodzka street) have been found, at 1.2 to 2m deep, medieval wooden buildings with ceramics dating back to the end of the 14th century - beginning of the 15th century. Remains of wooden structures from a post-16th century palisade have been also discovered.

Podwale Street acted as a transit route, leading to the trade route from Gdańsk and Świecie towards Inowrocław and southward. In the city, this trading road started at the "Gate of Gdansk" to the north, through the bridge over the Brda river and ended at the "Kujawska Gate" to the south.

Due to its location along the side of the castle wall, first buildings in Podwale street appeared only on its western side: on the eastern frontage, historians have localized a fortification erected here in the second half of the 17th century. However, other archaeological research performed in 2005 at Podwale 15 showed there was no rampart at this point, but rather a castle moat, which was not stabilized due to the rhythm of flooding of the river. It was set in the 15th century thanks to the creation of the first wooden structures. The moat was gradually inundated in the 14th century: with such a large, natural wide trench there was no need to build additional defenses.

The first records of houses and breweries in Podwale street date back to 1560. In the 1640s, 1650s and 1660s several brick buildings started to appear. After the takeover of the city by Prussia in 1772, the street name was changed to Wałowa, then Wallstraße.

On a detailed plan of Bromberg drawn by the Prussian geometer Gretha in 1774, the western side of the street shows few empty plots located in the area of Długa street, Zaułek Street and in the corner of Grodzka street, whereas the eastern side displays very few buildings standing only in the corners of Grodzka street and at Kujawska Gate. In 1787, at the crossing with Magdzińskiego street, was built the former evangelical parish church, and in 1809 the first buildings in the southern part of Podwale (present Nr.11 to 15) have been erected. By the mid 17th century, Podwale street displayed an uninterrupted frontage of houses.

In 1899, extensive work started, aimed at getting rid of the former castle hill, lying on the east side of Podwale street:

- the evangelical parish church was demolished;
- the city Market Hall was erected (1904);
- Magdzińskiego street was extended eastward.

Podwale street, thus shaped at the beginning of the 20th century, did not change for decades that came. In 2010, the street has been included in the Revitalization Plan of downtown Bydgoszcz.

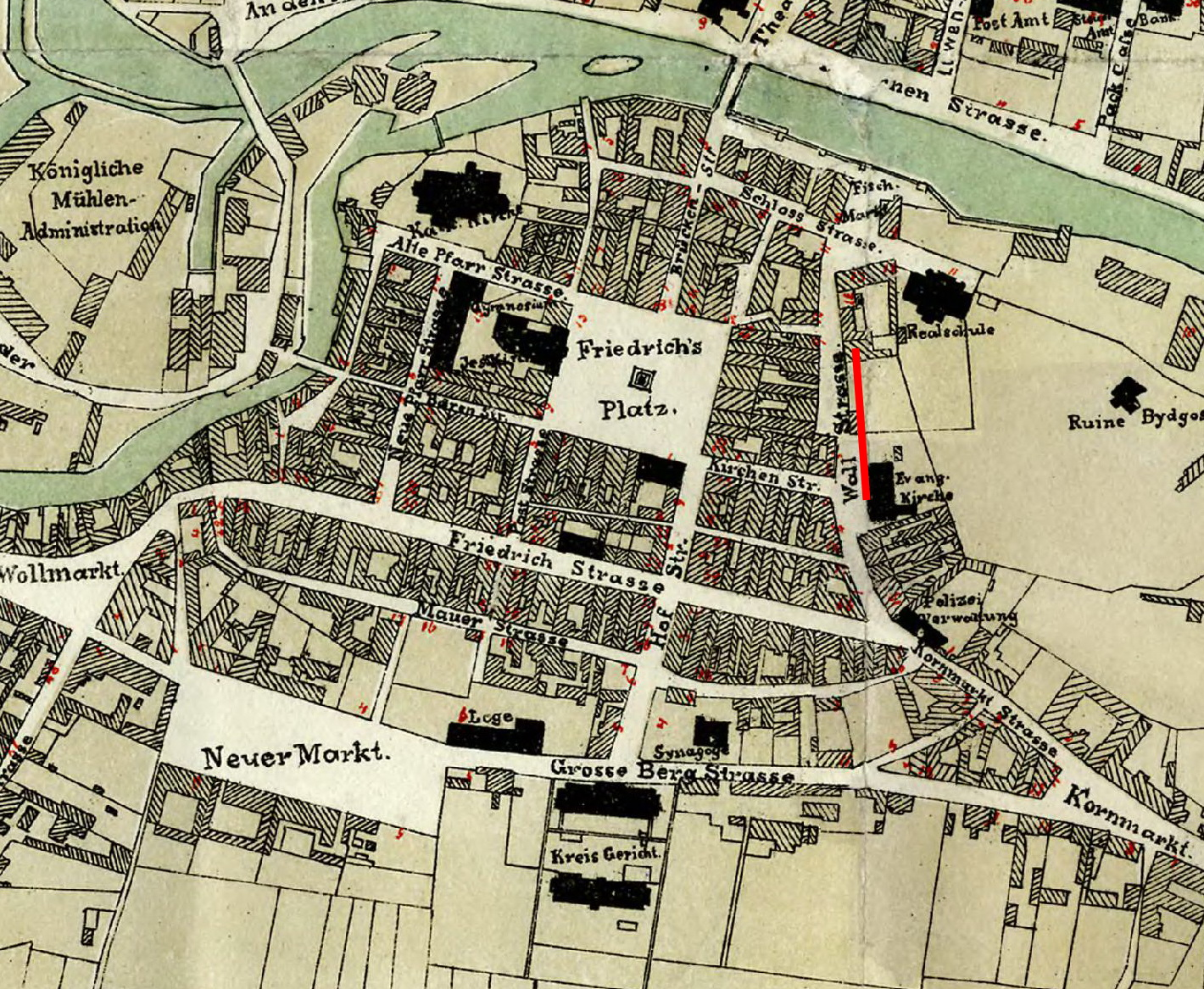
The street underlined on an 1876 map

== Main places and buildings ==
=== Bydgoszcz Chamber theatre, corner with 14/16 Grodzka Street ===
Registered on the Kuyavian-Pomeranian Heritage list Nr.601341, Reg.A/887, (June 21, 1993).

1850s

The building housed Bydgoszcz Chamber theatre between 1961 and 1989, the second dramatic stage theater in the city.

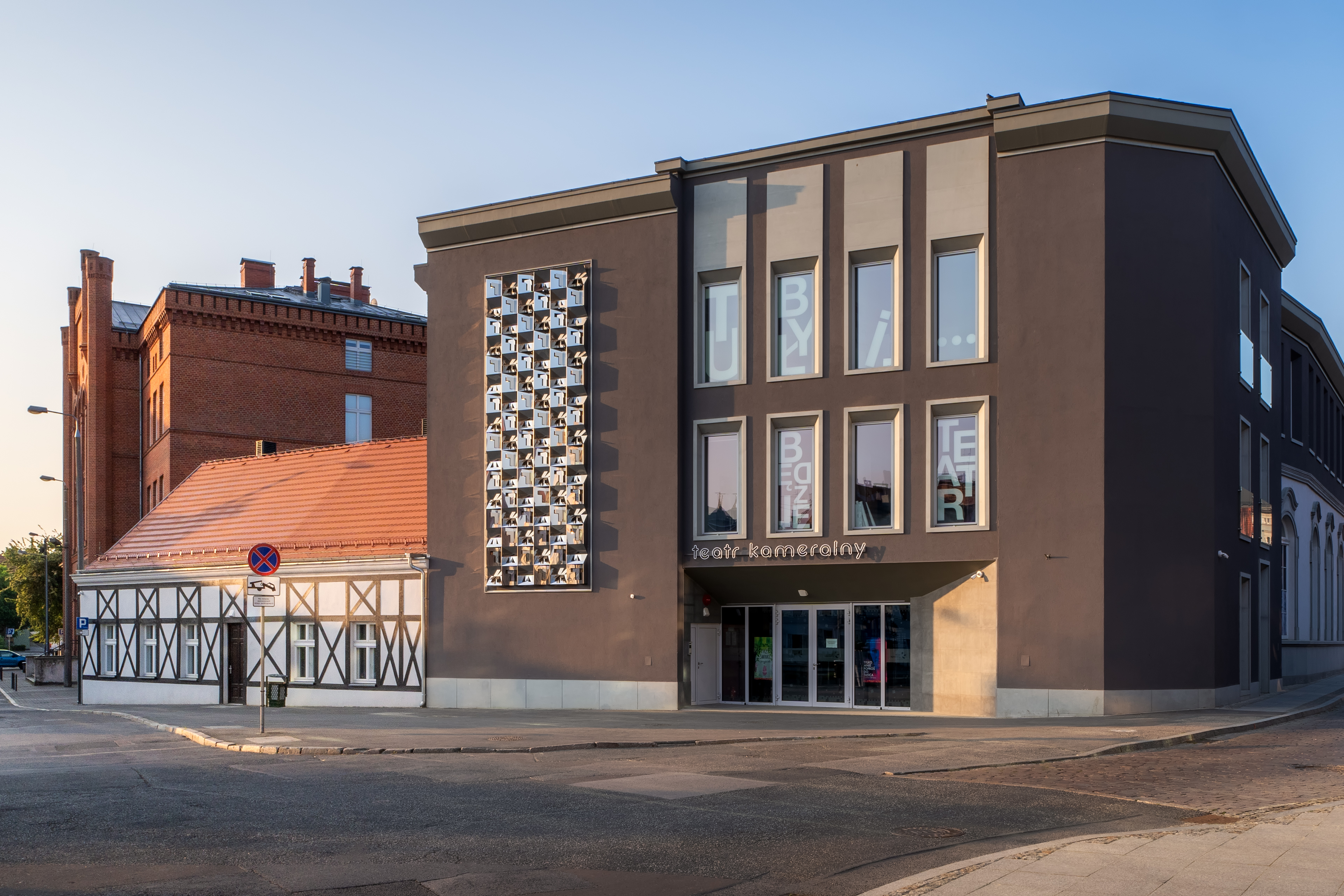
Bydgoszcz Chamber theatre

=== House at the corner with Kręta street ===
1878, by Albert Rose

Eclecticism, industrial architecture

The building bore initially the Nr.10 at Wallstraße, its first referenced owner being Ignacy Walarecy, a baker residing at Friedrich Straße 4 (now Długa street 74). It then housed a butcher shop run by Abraham Henoch. In 1872, the edifice was part of Herman Franke's industrial complex together with abutting building at Nr.10.

Hermann's flagship was the spirit refinery on Mill Island. Today, the house welcomes, among others, the "Eljazz music club".

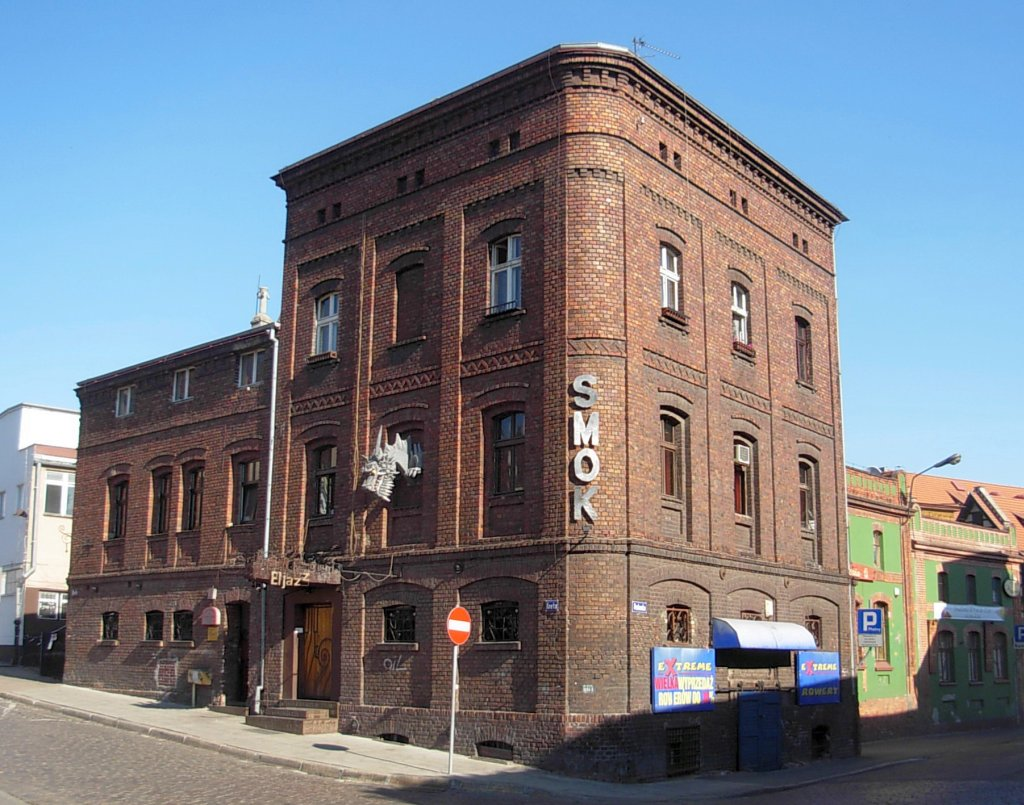
Main elevation.

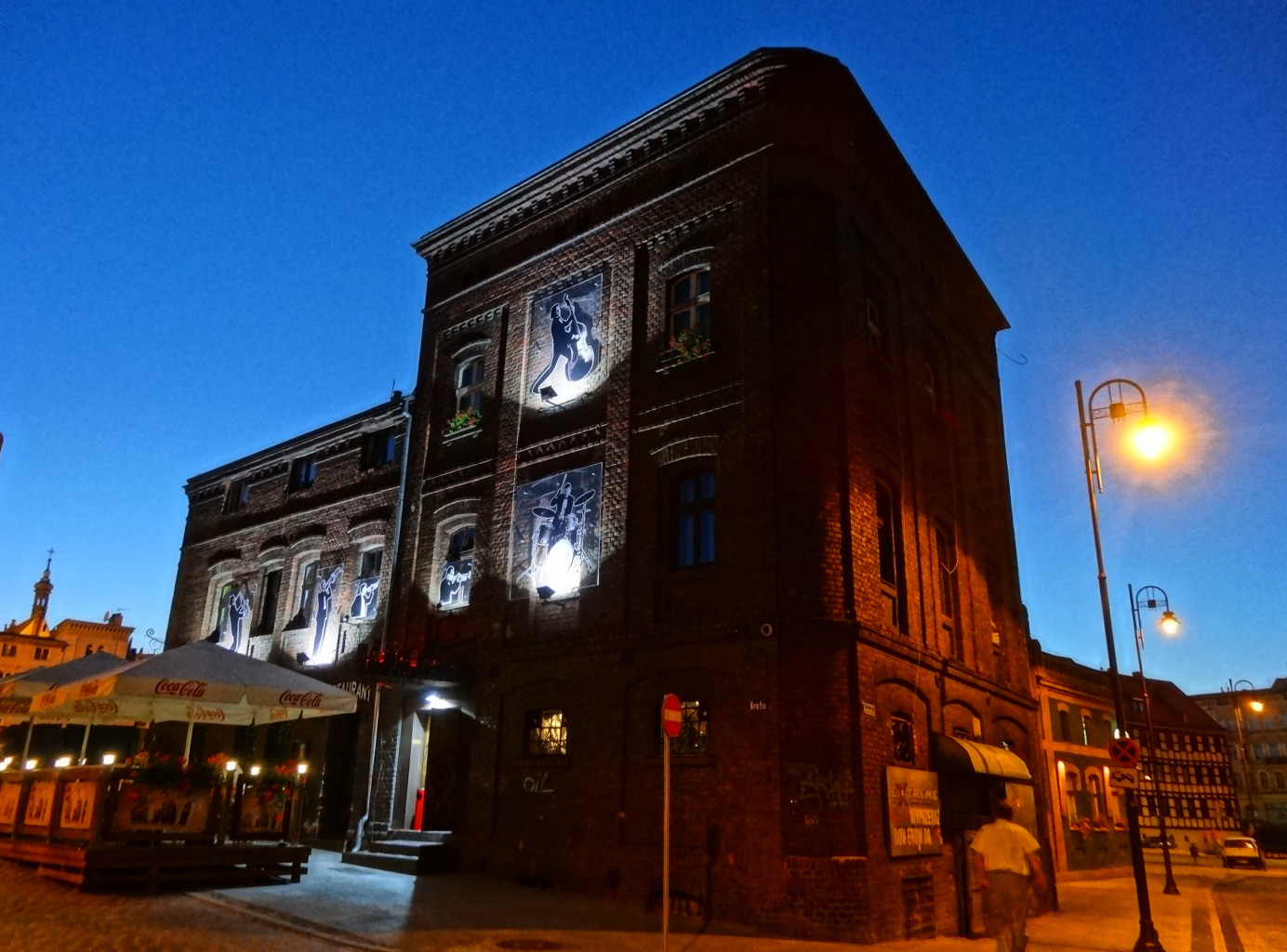
By night.

=== Municipal Market Hall, at 4 ===
Registered on the Kuyavian-Pomeranian Heritage list Nr.601393, Reg.A/971 (April 11, 1971)

1904

Neo-Gothic

The eastern side of the present Market Hall stands on what was until the 18th century the moat of the castle of Bydgoszcz, parting the Old Town and the fortified edifice of the Starostwo. At the end of the 18th century, the moat, useless, had gradually silted up, leveling with the area around. In 1787, Prussian authorities constructed in its place a parish evangelical church, the first non-Catholic church in the city. This church served the Evangelical urban communities throughout the 19th century.

In 1899, an intensive work has been carried out to clean the site of the former castle hill, lying on the east side of Podwale street, demolishing the evangelical church. A few years later, in 1904, the Municipal Market Hall (German: Städtische Markthalle) has been erected and extended eastward, on Magdzińskiego street. The building has been designed by the company "Boswau & Knauer GmbH" from Berlin. It has been built at a time when civil society started to take matters related to health and hygiene into consideration: hence the roofed hall to maintain hygiene standards in the food trade. The city of Bromberg was the main investor of the project. In addition to the plot of the Evangelical church, part of neighbouring property of rentier Albert Wiese was used. The construction started in autumn 1904 and ended in the spring 1906: the official opening took place on Friday 20 July 1906, in the presence of municipal authorities. Part of the Market Hall giving onto Podwale street housed accommodations, such as the apartment of the inspector of the Hall, veterinarian offices or a police station. Under the main hall was room for 96 stands, the vast majority of them being meat stands. Each stand (meat and fish) had been provided with a separate number and company name. The building includes a 3.5 m high cellars. A ring of bell proclaimed the end and beginning of trade. While inside the Hall only meat (including fish and sea products) was sold, other goods could be bought at the weekly fairs held in the open squares. Today the complex is open to all kind of trade, under the ownership of Bydgoszcz's grocers (Polish: "Bydgoska Spółdzielnia Spożywców w Bydgoszczy"). In 2009, a full renovation of the building has been carried out.

The Market Hall has a rectangular shape and is covered with glass-steel panes, the facades are made of brick. Above the main entrance gate stands the crest of Bydgoszcz.

The ensemble combines Neo-Gothic elements with modernist features:

- the south-east corner has a tower topped with a tented roof;
- the south-west corner is beveled, the summit is crenelated stepped, with a large semi-circular door opening;
- the south elevation and eastern elevations have large, semicircular topped windows, with tracery;
- the western elevation on Podwale street is different, with storeys, and covered with a pitched roof.
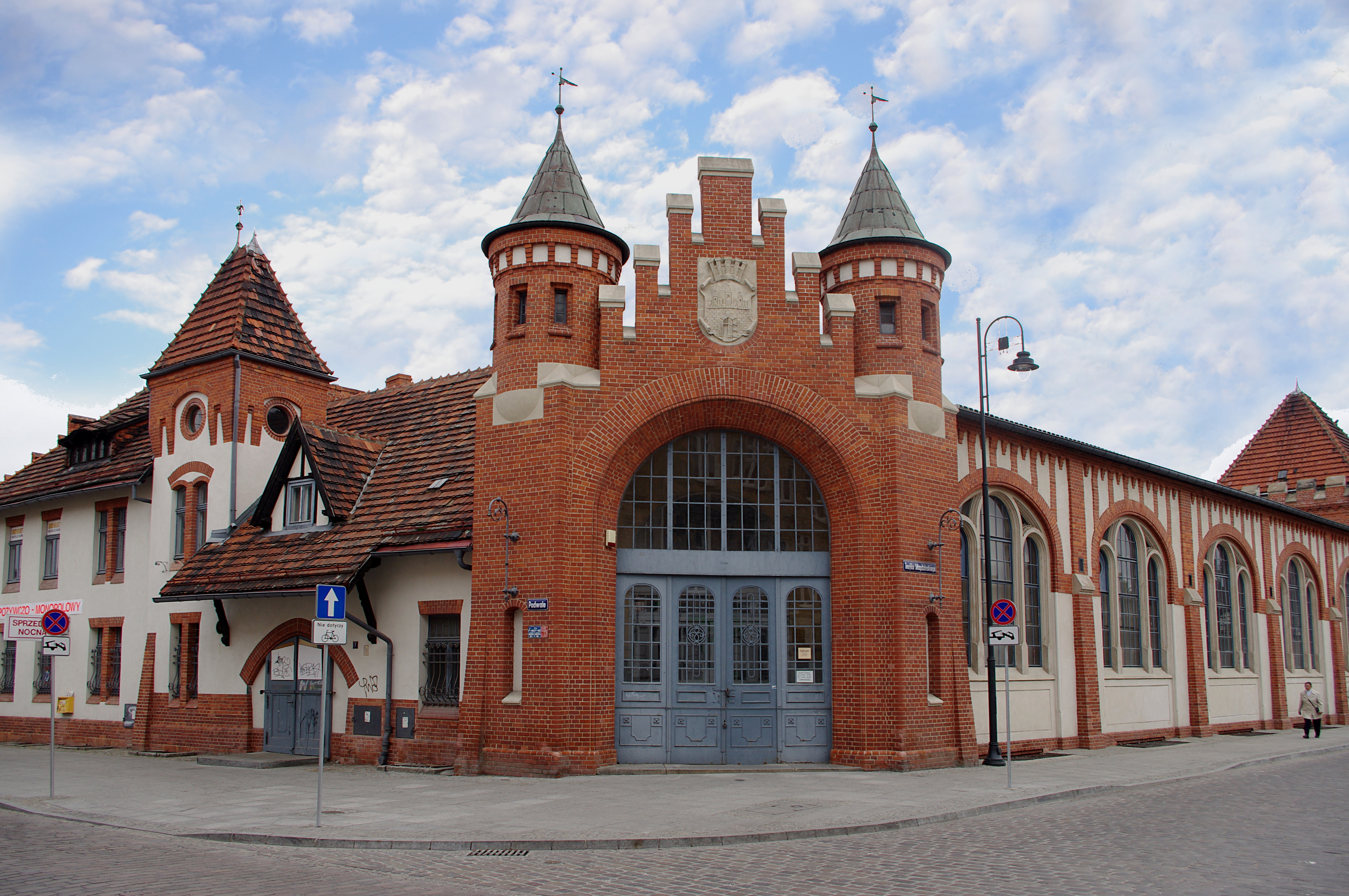
Main Gate View

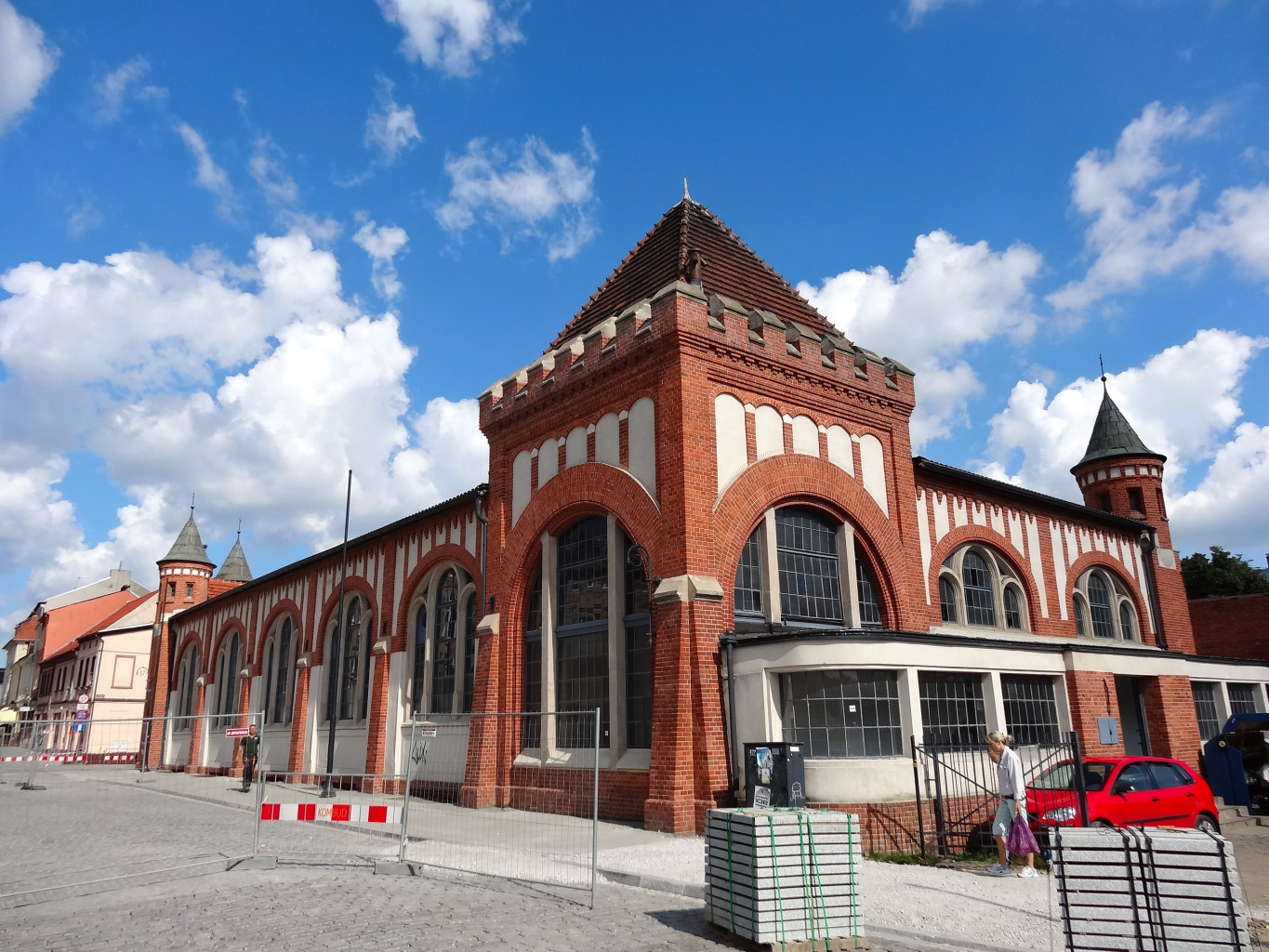
Corner tower with high glass windows

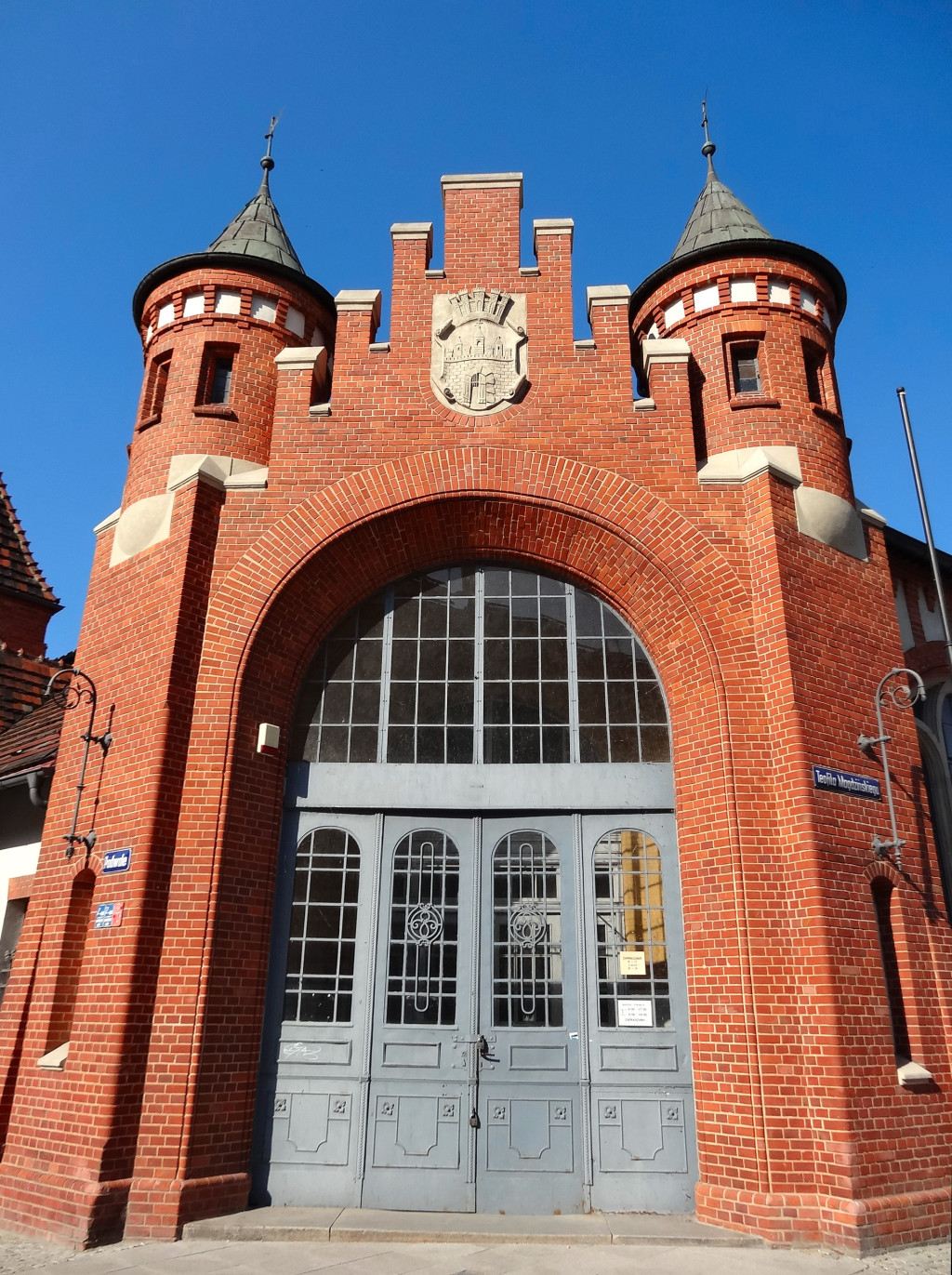
Main gate detail

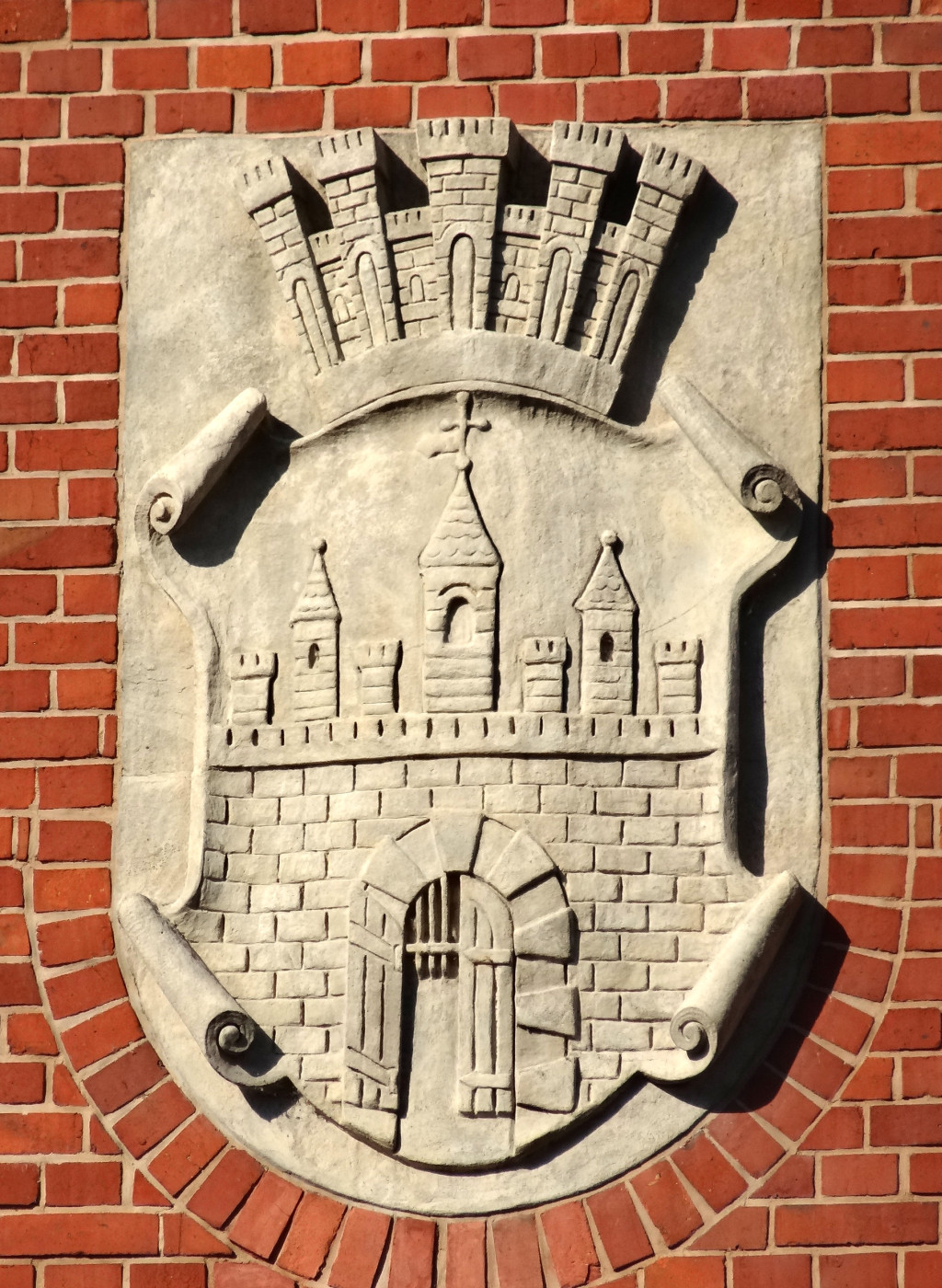
Bydgoszcz crest

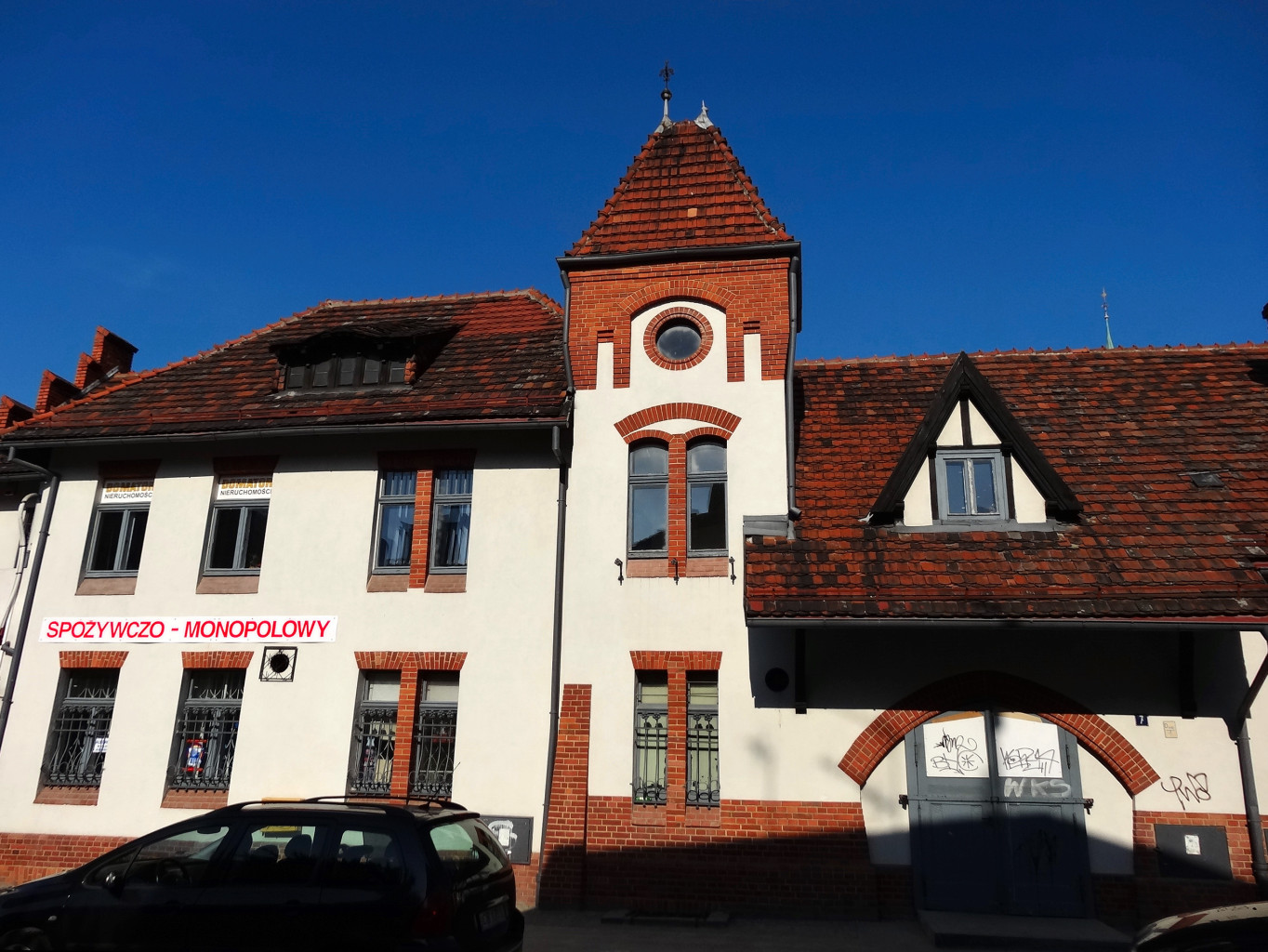
Rear of the Market Hall
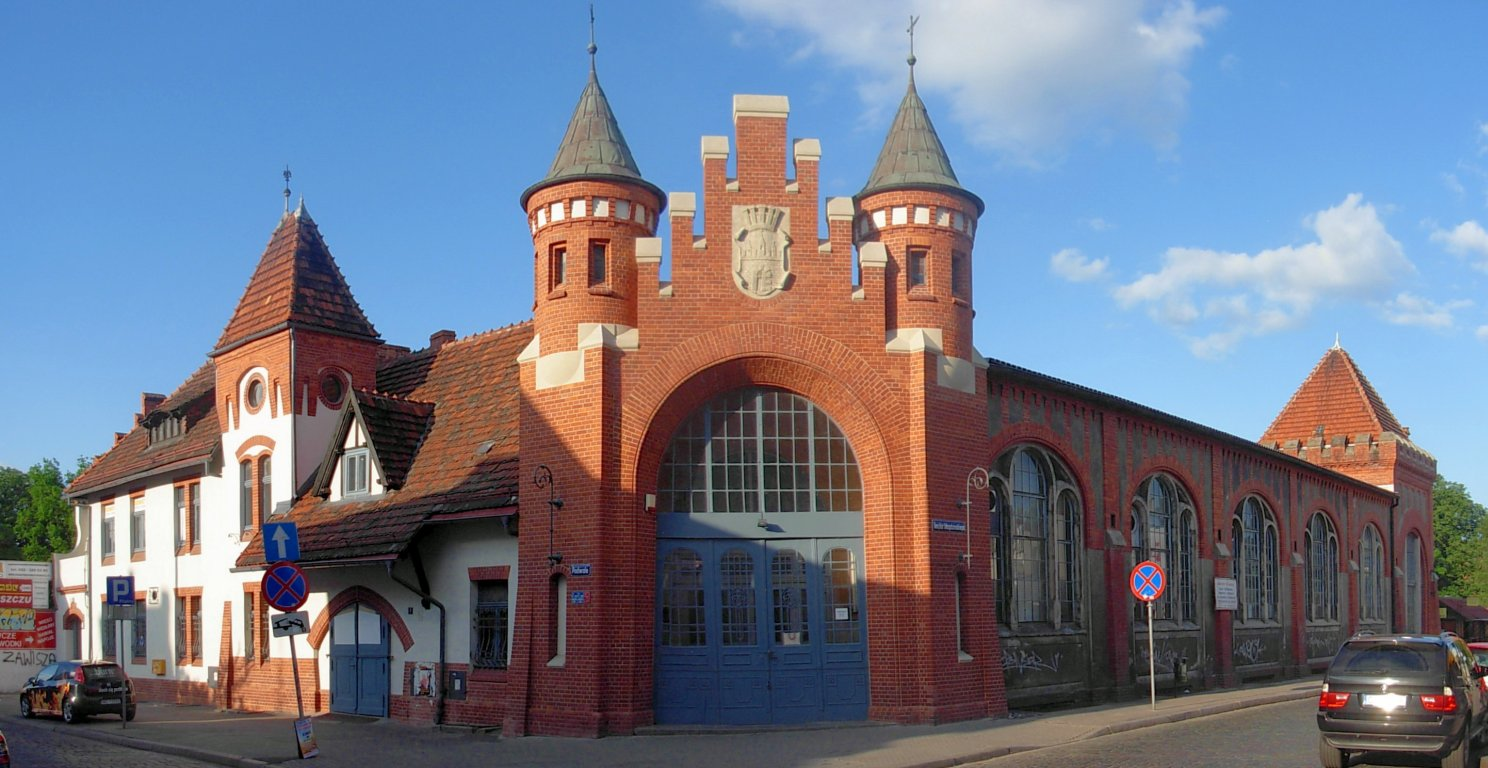
Panoramic view of Market Hall

=== Building cornering Magdzińskiego street ===
Registered on the Kuyavian-Pomeranian Heritage list Nr.711447, Reg.A/1355/1-3 (February 27, 2008).

1782–1785, rebuilt in 1879

Originally at Wallstraße 17 and dated back to the late 18th century, it has been rebuilt in 1879–1880 by its then owner, Heinrich Schrödter, a butcher. It then was the property of a merchant, Ber Cohn, until the end of World War I.

The building has been renovated in 2018. Since January 2019, it has been housing a brand new Nightclub, the Point Club.

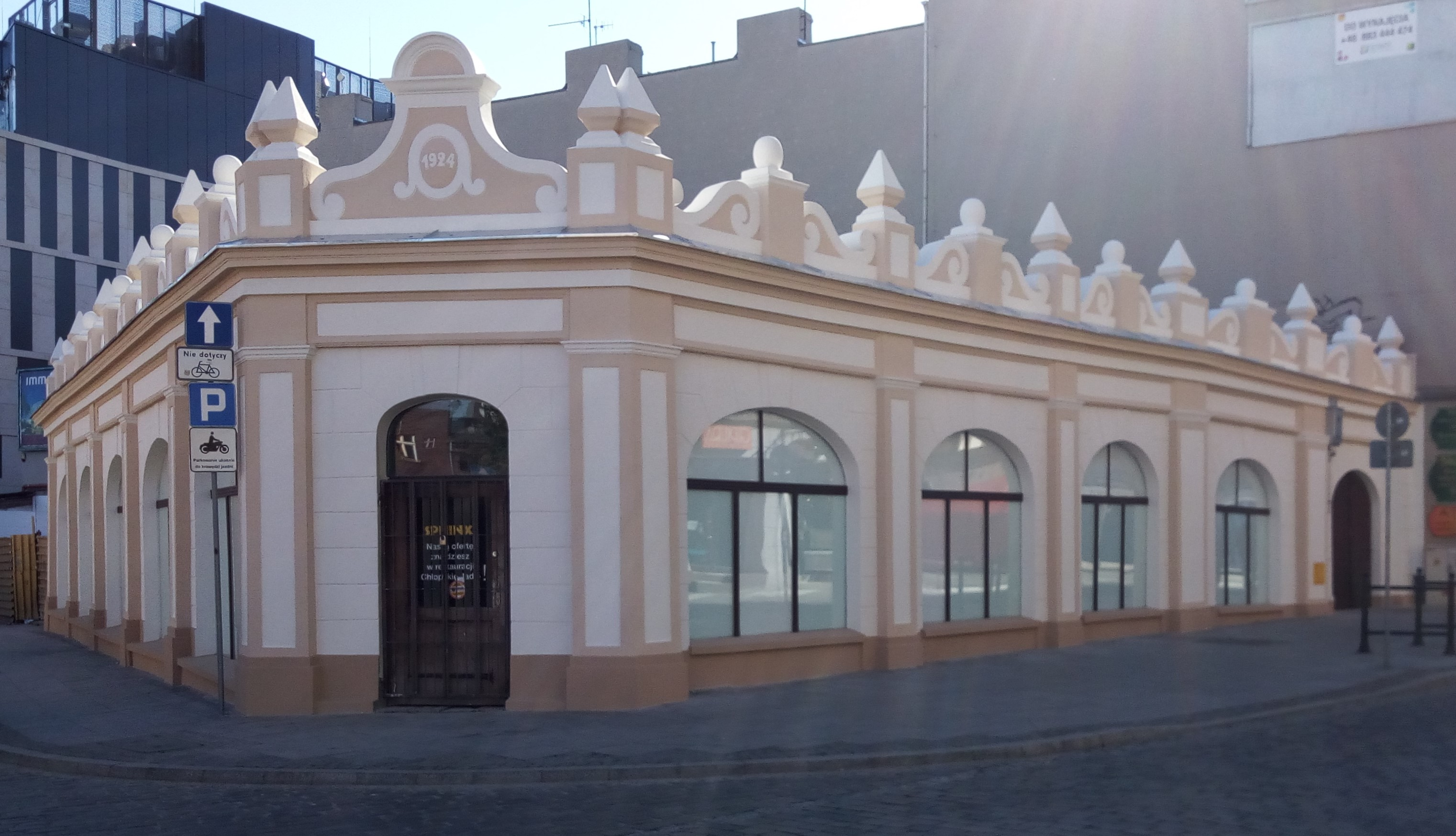
View from street intersection

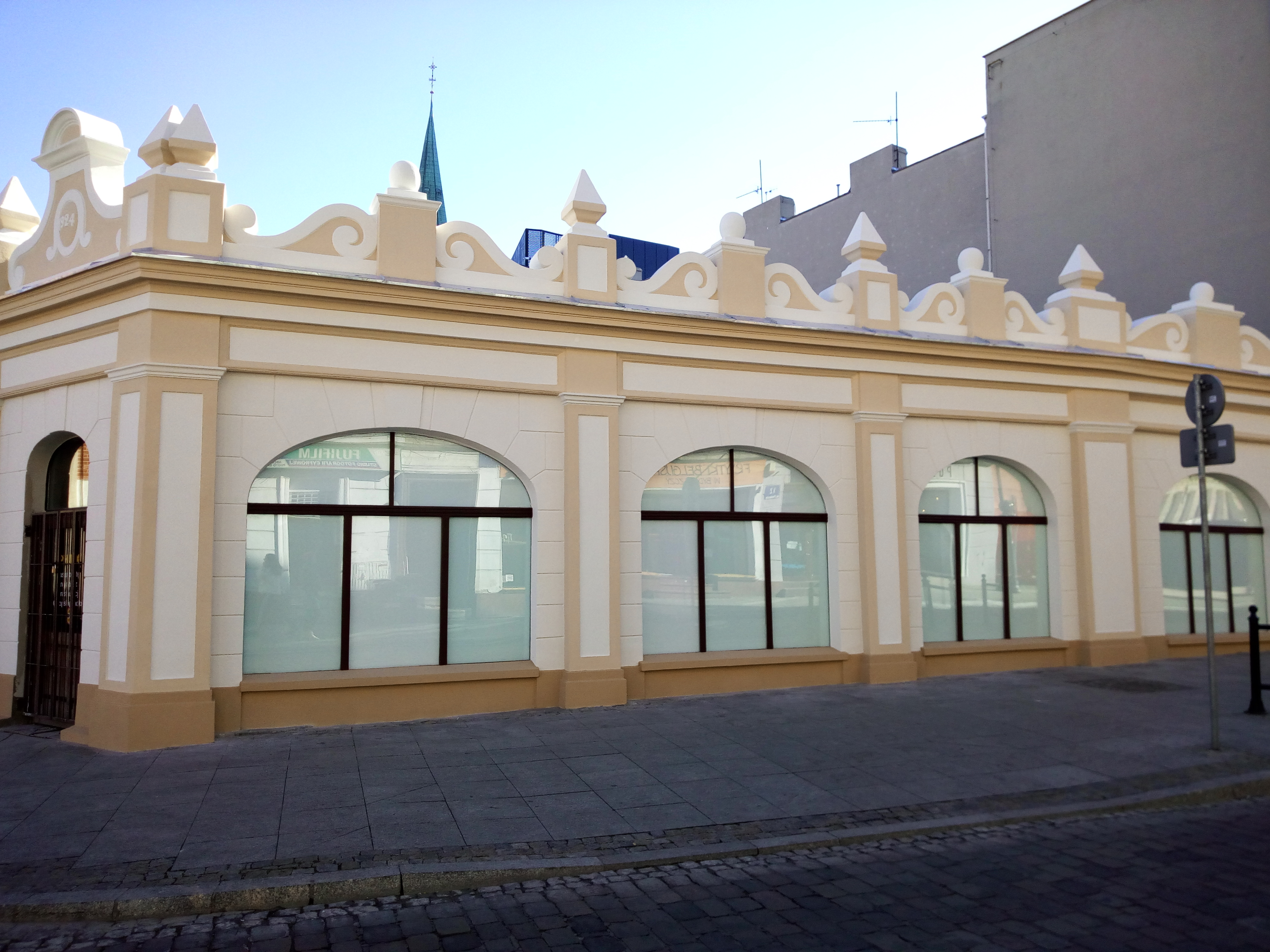
Detail of the renovated facade

=== House at 11 ===
Registered on the Kuyavian-Pomeranian Heritage list Nr.711447, Reg.A/1355/1-3 (February 27, 2008).

1782, 1879

Eclecticism

Before the current building, the place hosted the first distillery factory of Carl August Franke, which also had additional plots at Kręta 3. Carl's son, Hermann, developed the activity by building in 1893 a huge complex on Mill Island, Polish: Wyspa Młynska.

Initial location was Wallstraße 18, owned by a baker, Hermann Brund, living in Hofstraße 2 (now Jana Kaziemirza street). In the 1920s, the landlord, Ksawery Kamiński, had a restaurant there. The townhouse seats opposite Zaułek street.

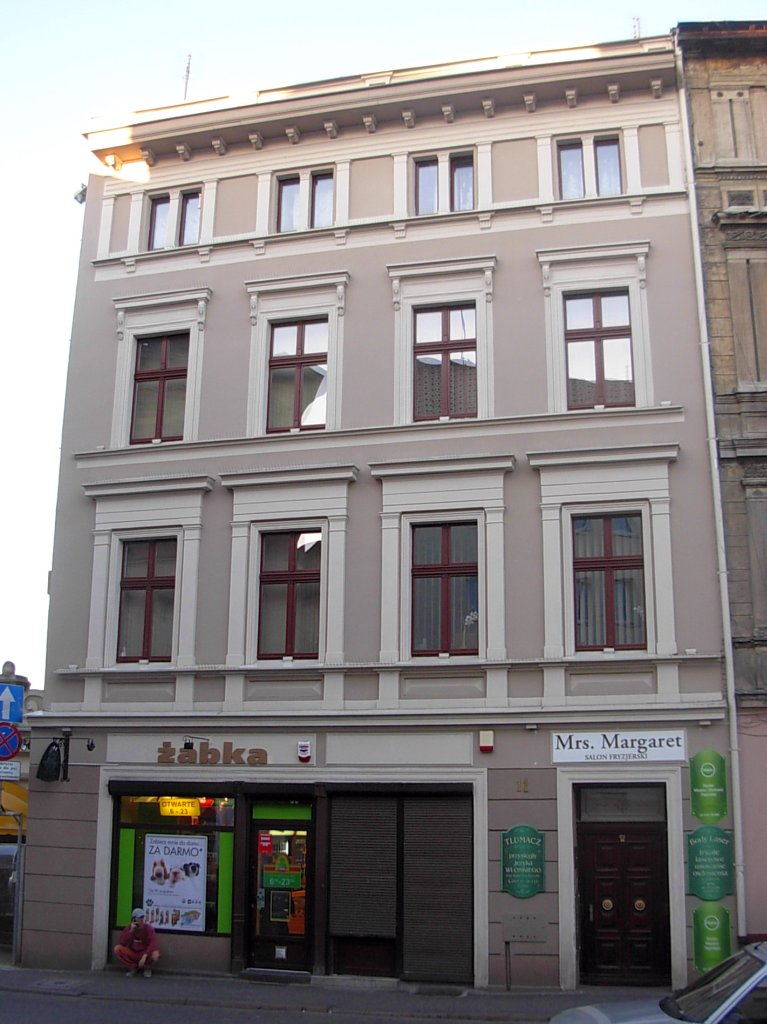
Main elevation

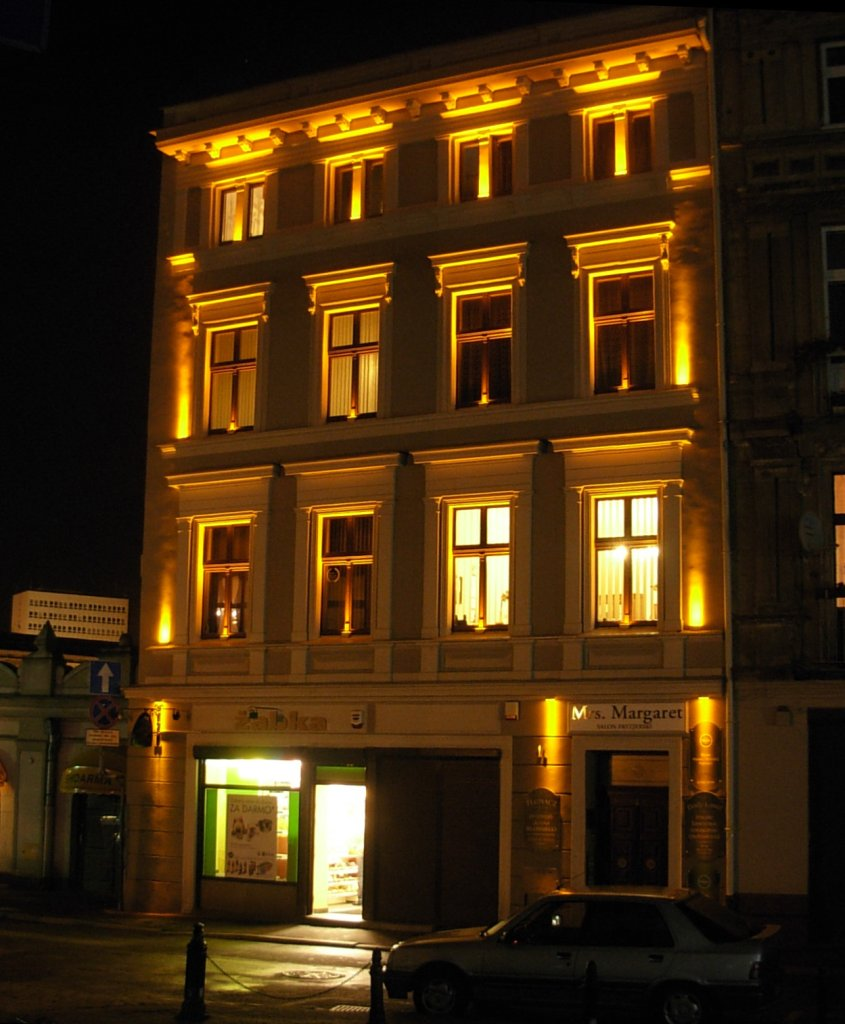
By night

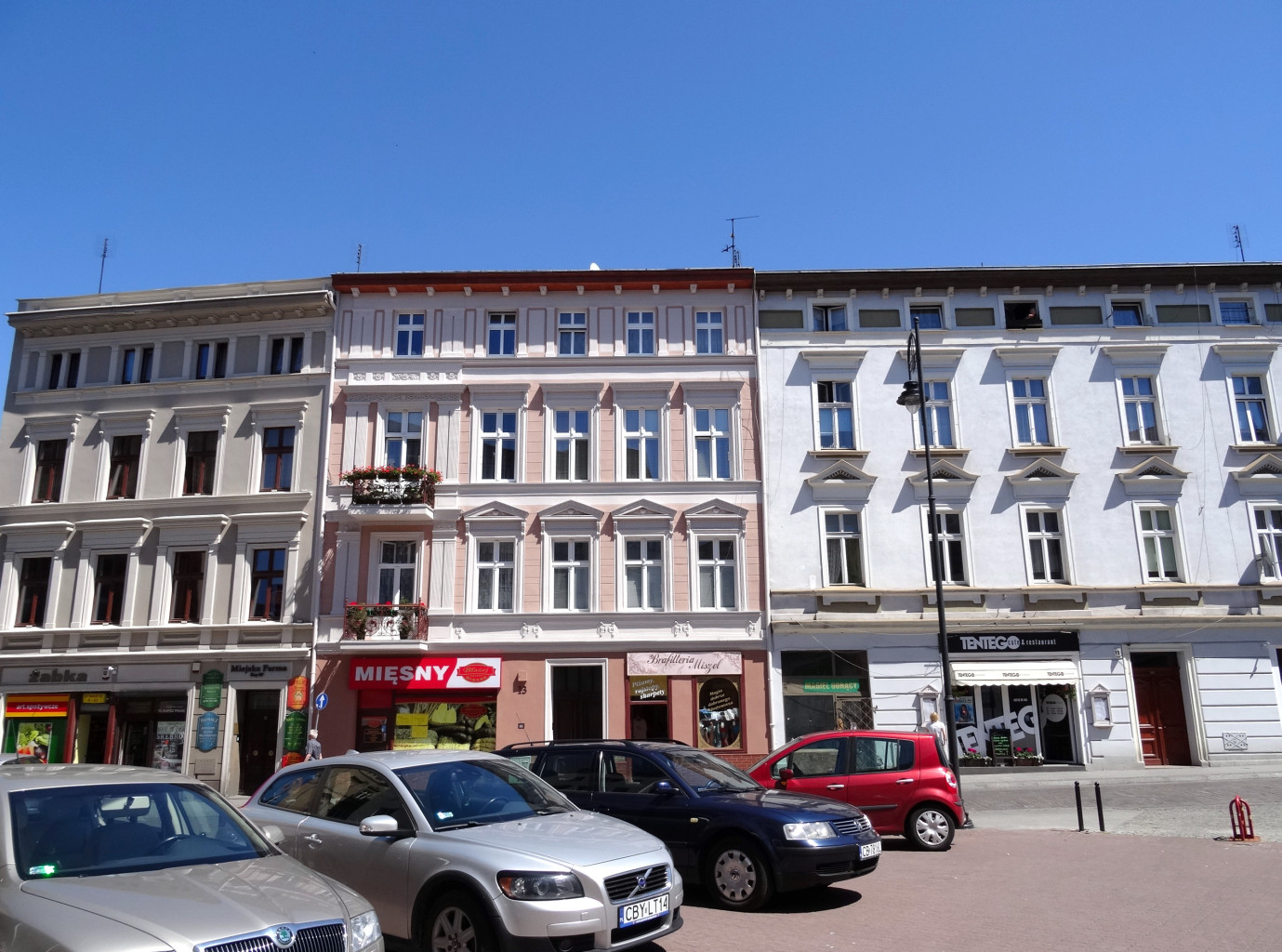
Frontages of Nr.11, 13, 15 (left to right)

=== J.G. Böhlke's soap factory, at 12, corner with Magdzińskiego and Zaułek streets ===
1871-1875

Eclecticism

This large tenement covers today a block between Magdzińskiego and Zaułek streets. Originally, it had two referenced addresses: Kirchen Straße 5 (side on Magdzińskiego) and Wallstraße 2 (Zaułek ). The building at Kirchen Straße 5 had as first registered landlord Johann Franz Semerau, a merchant in copper business, whereas the one at Wallstraße 2 was owned by J.G. Böhlke, founder of I.G. Böhlke, a soap factory (German: seifenfabrik) in 1849 which moved to this location in the early 1870s. At the end of the 19th century, the flourishing company produced annually around 1000 tons of soap and 500 tons of lubricants. With the rebirth of Polish state, the firm was renamed Towarzystwo Akcyjne Bydgoska Fabryka Mydeł (English: Bydgoszcz Soap Joint Stock Company) and remained operational till the end of WWII.

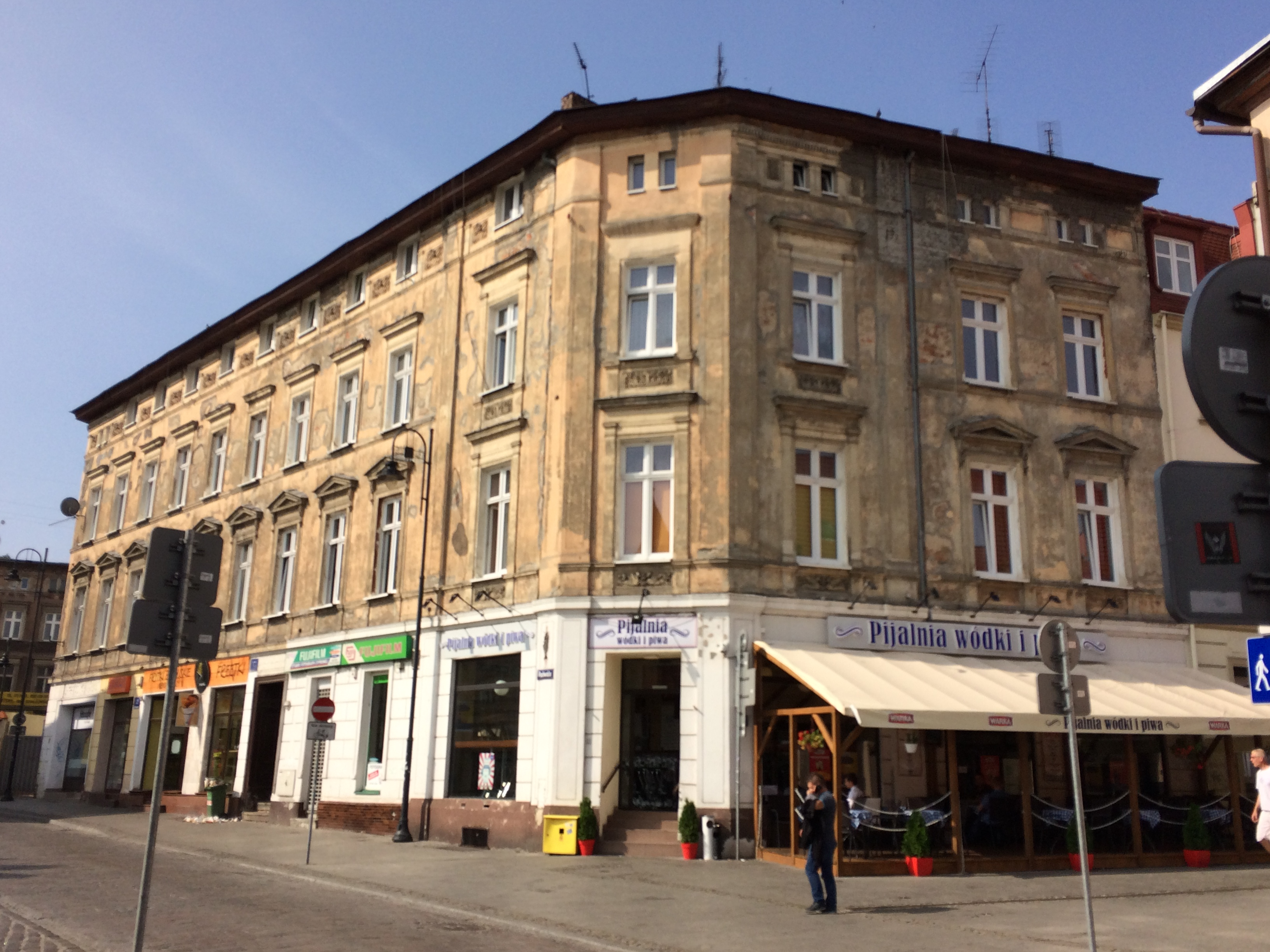
View of the tenement from the street

=== House at 13 ===
Registered on the Kuyavian-Pomeranian Heritage list Nr.787206, Reg.A/1623 (January 7, 2013).

1878-1879

Eclecticism

This tenement, initially at Wallstraße 19, has been first possessed by Martin Rasp, a painter, then in the 1890s a baker, Ignac Gröger, moved in.

The very ancient basement house old wells, from which residents used to draw water from.

The frontage has undergone a deep renovation in 2014, including the reconstruction of balconies. In particular, some architectural motifs are worth noticing, such as the ones adorning the openings (pilasters, friezes, cartouches with rosettes).

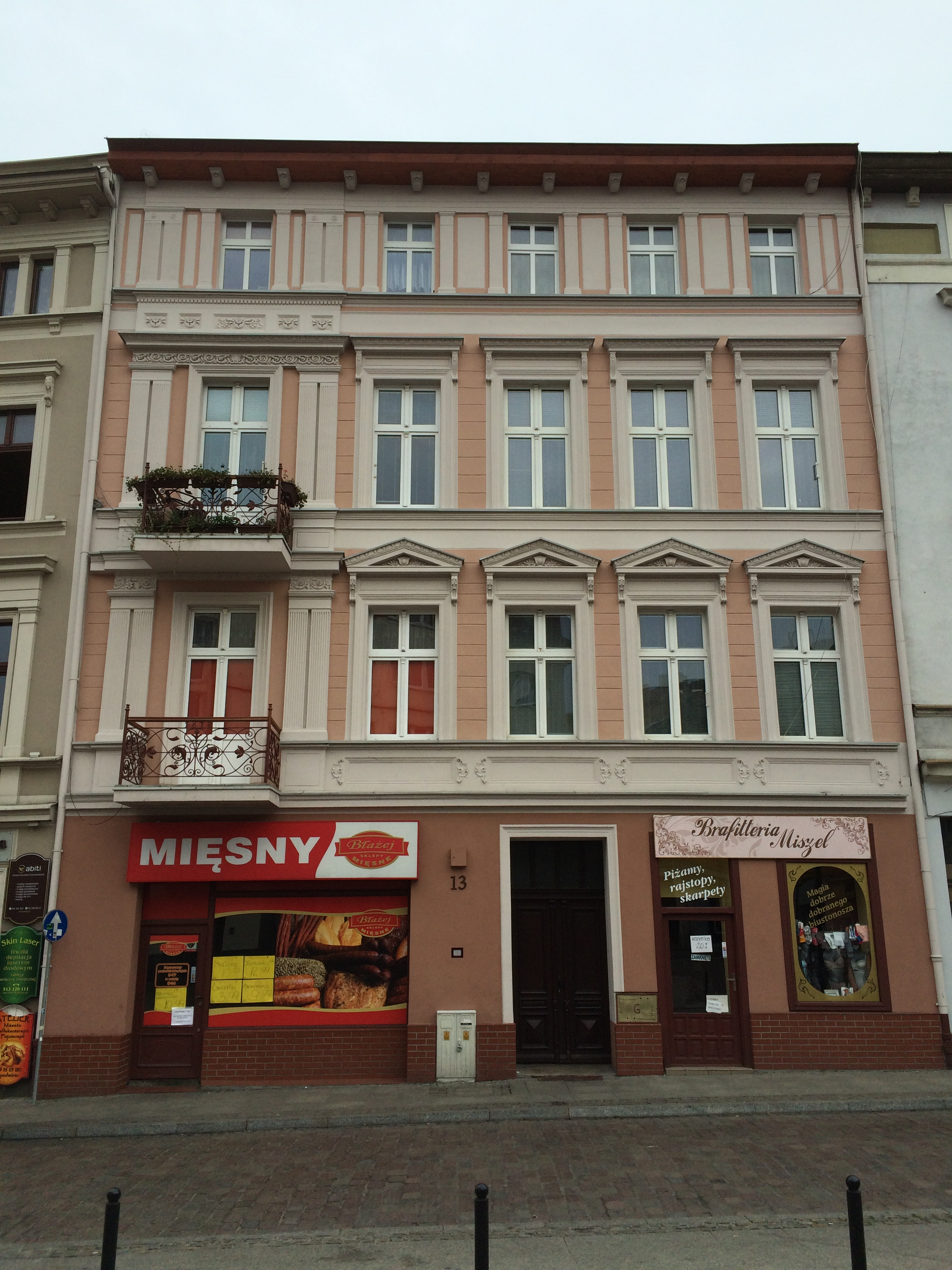
House at Podwale 13 after renovation

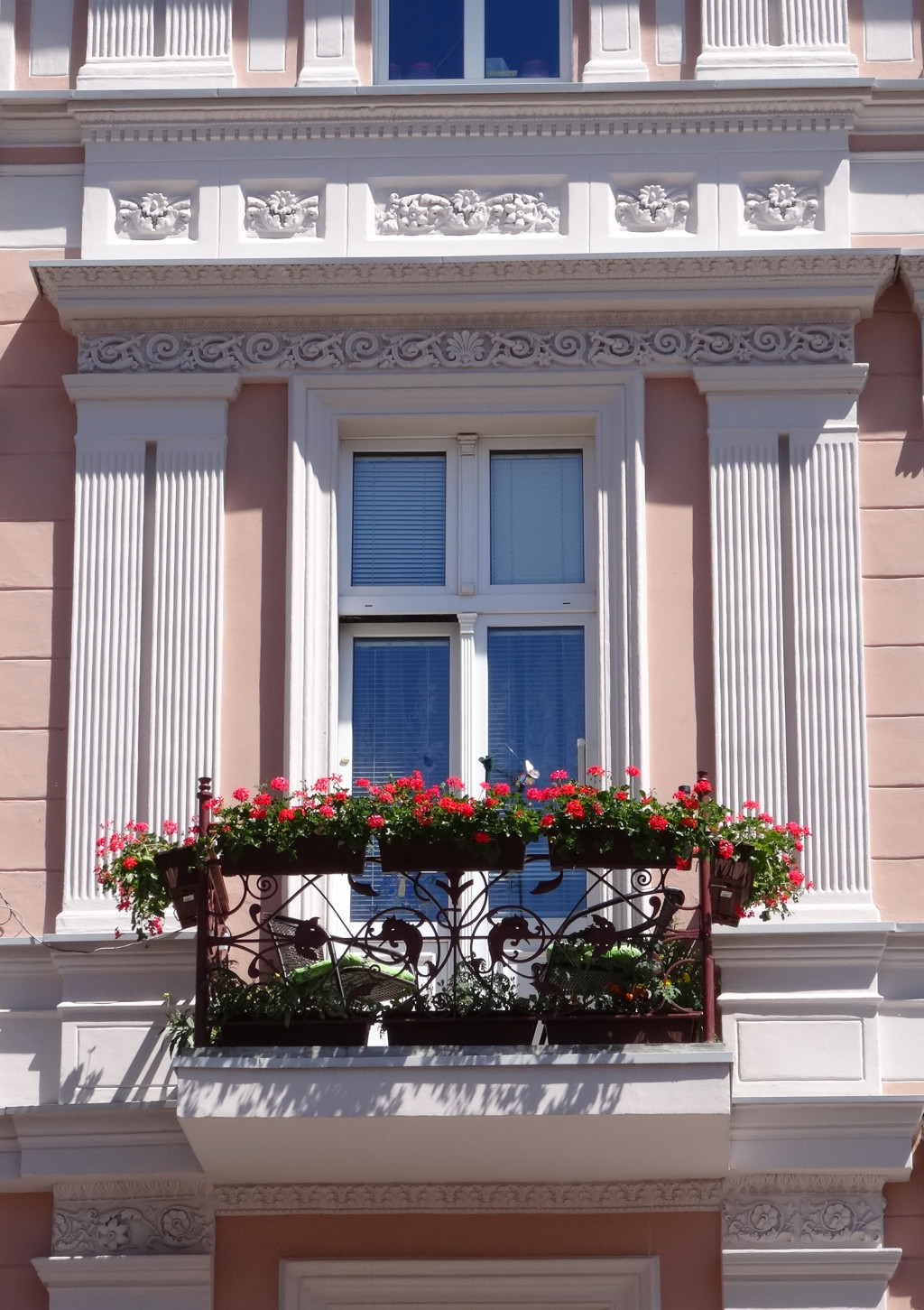
Details of the motifs

=== House at 15 ===
1850–1900, by Józef Święcicki and Anton Hoffmann

Eclecticism

This old building at then Wallstraße 20, used to shelter a distillating workshop owned by landlord Salomon Cohn and his heir Sally from 1869 to World War I. Sally Cohn lived there till 1922.

This corner house has been rebuilt in 1883 on a design by Józef Święcicki and Anton Hoffmann, giving it a second storey. In 1895–1896, the third floor was added thanks to a design by Karl Bergner, with a large front shop giving onto the street. At the beginning of the 20th century, in an adjacent building was located the municipal police station.

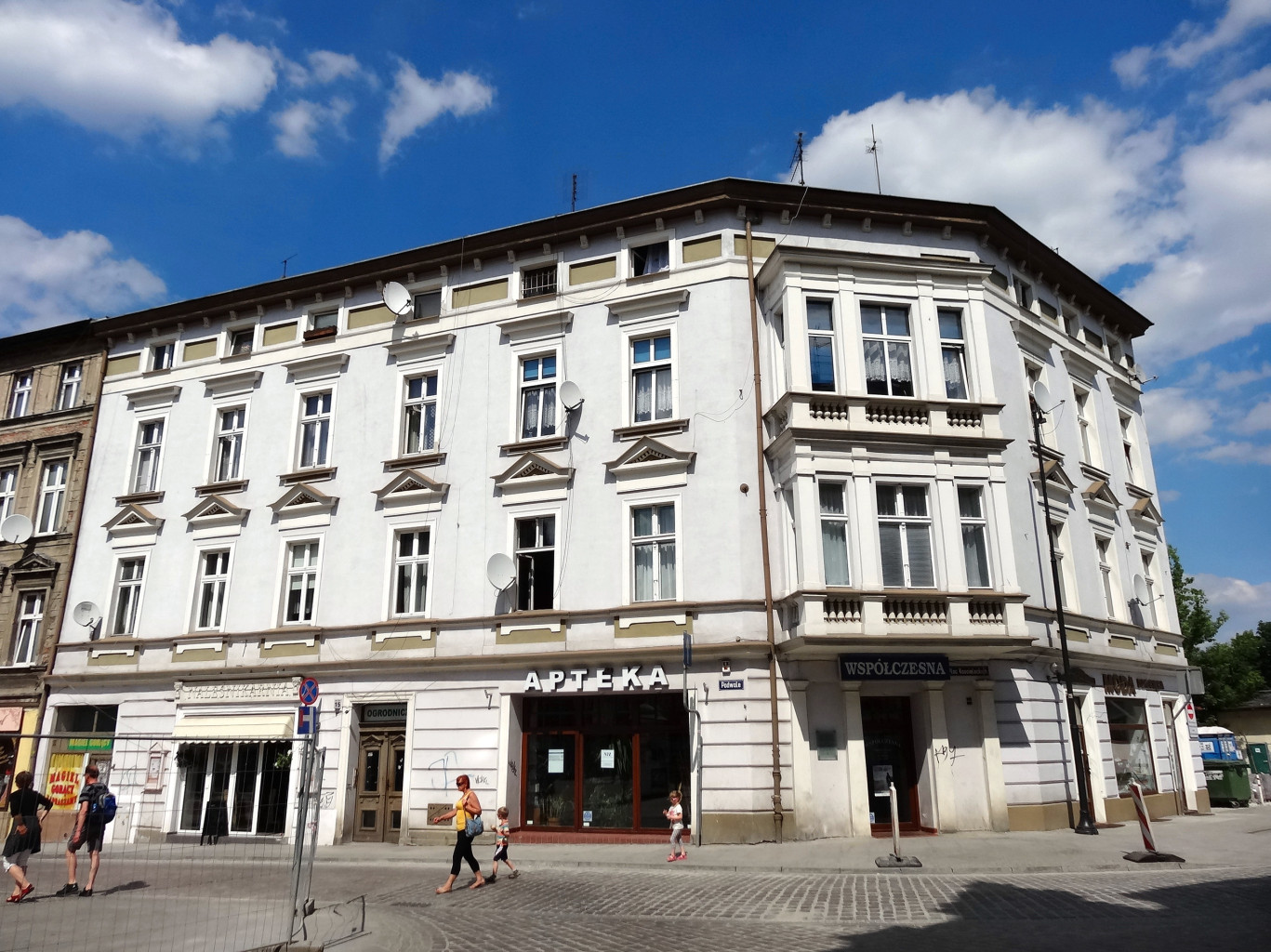
Main elevation.

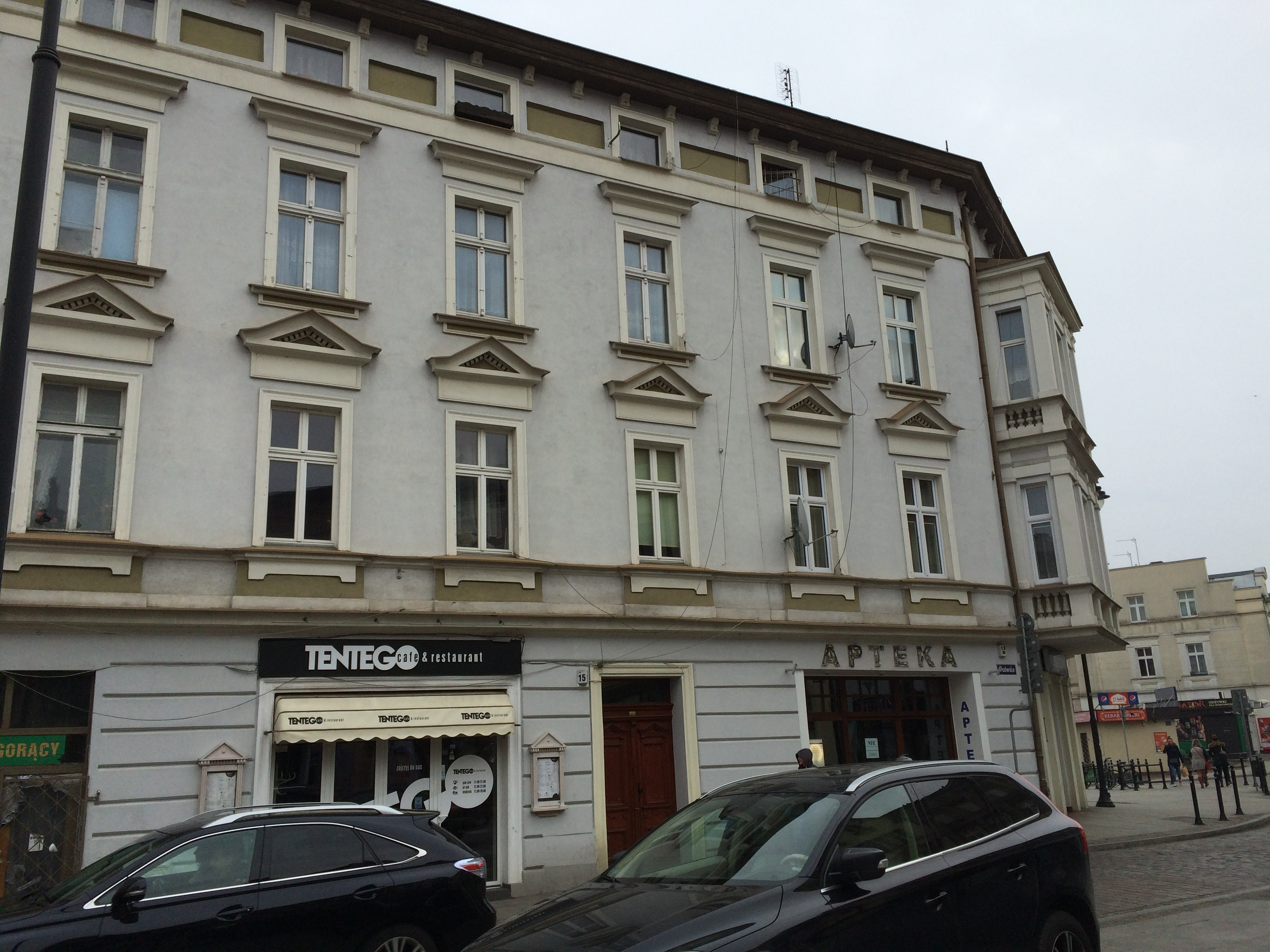
Facade on Podwale street

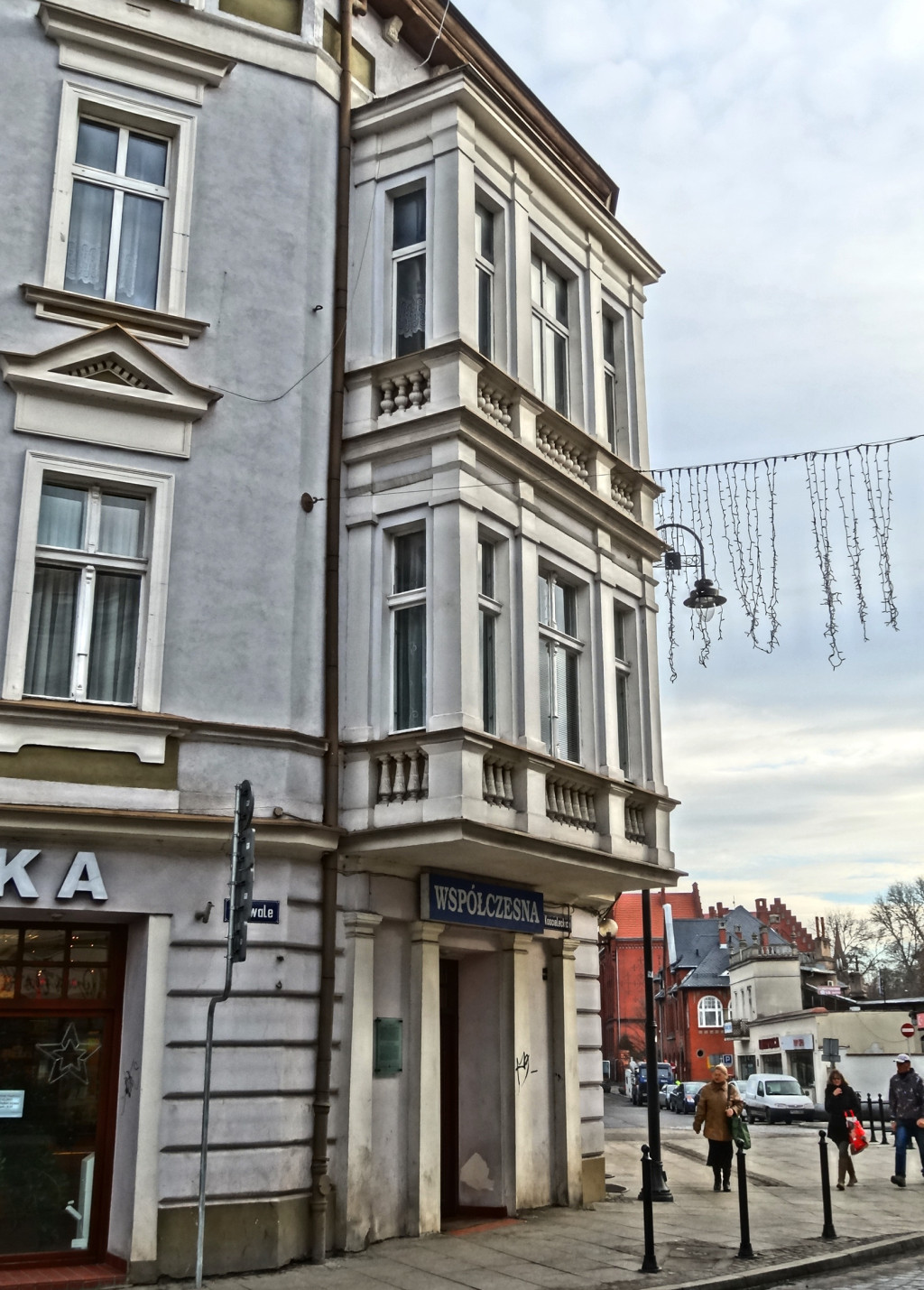
Detail of the bay-window
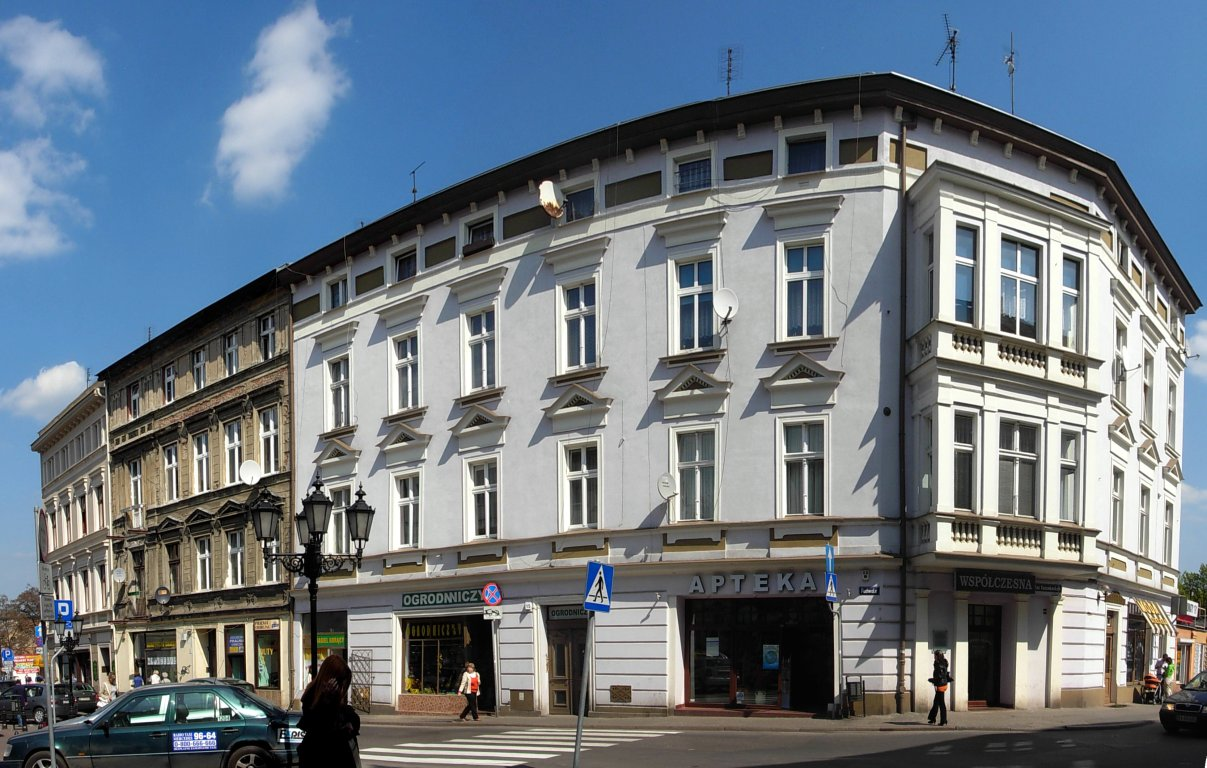
Panoramic view of Podwale street tenements at Nr.11 (back left), Nr.13 (middle), Nr.°15 (front right).

== See also ==
- Gdańska Street, Bydgoszcz
- Grodzka Street in Bydgoszcz
- Theatre square in Bydgoszcz
- Jagiellońska street in Bydgoszcz
- Stary Port Street in Bydgoszcz

== Bibliography ==
- (in Polish) Derenda, Jerzy (2006). Piękna stara Bydgoszcz, t. I z serii Bydgoszcz, miasto na Kujawach. Bydgoszcz: warzystwo Miłośników Miasta Bydgoszczy.
- (in Polish) Umiński, Janusz (1996). Bydgoszcz. Przewodnik. Bydgoszcz: Regionalny Oddział PTTK "Szlak Brdy".
- (in Polish) Garbaczewski, Witold (2007). Stuletnia hala targowa. Kalendarz Bydgoski. Bydgoszcz: Towarzystwo Miłośników Miasta Bydgoszczy.
