= Franke family (Bydgoszcz) =

Prussian family of Bromberg

- Entrepreneurs
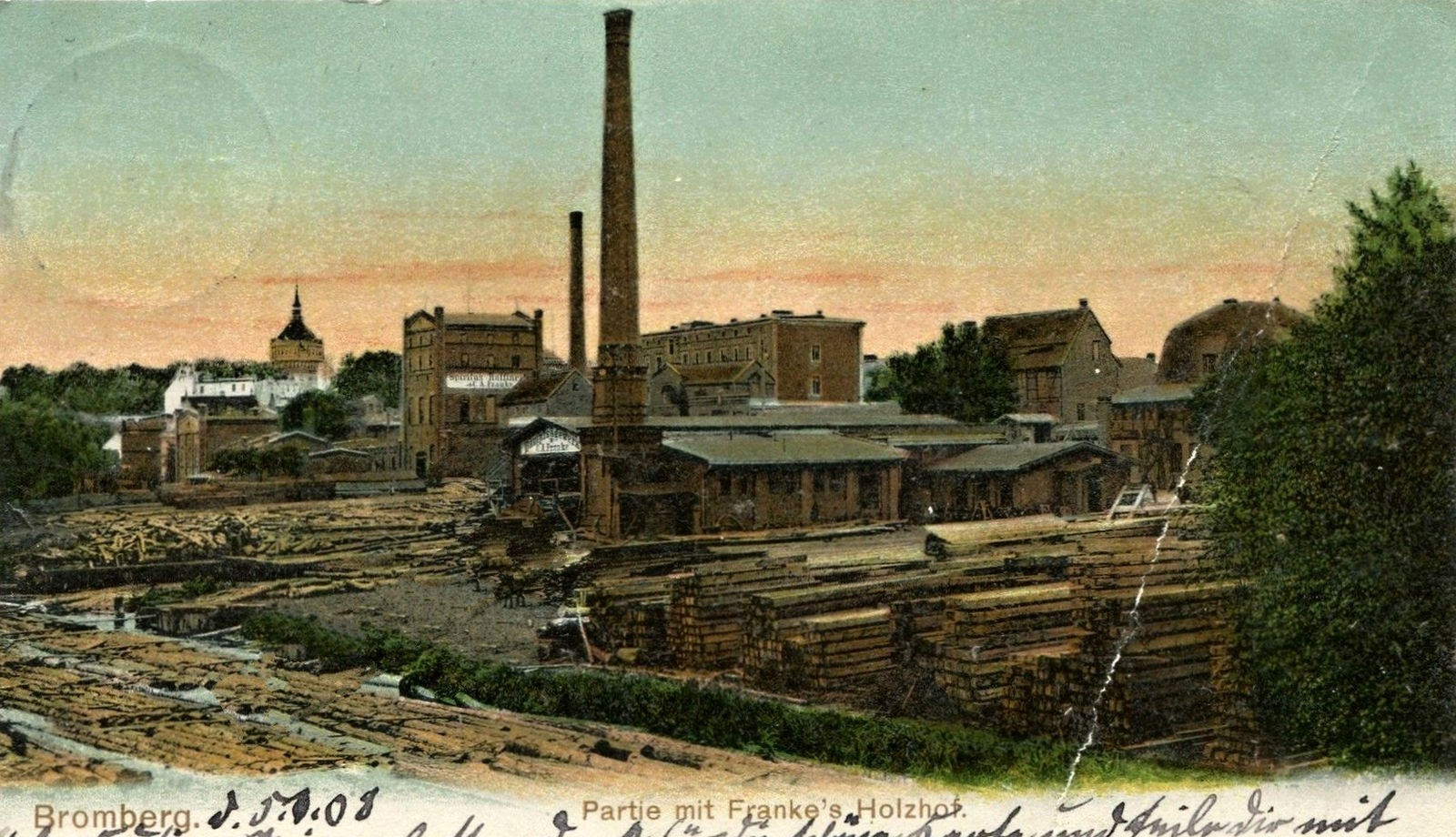
- Franke refinery ca 1908
- Country: Kingdom of Prussia
- Current region: Bromberg
- Origin: Lissa, Kingdom of Prussia, German Empire
- Founded: 1827
- Founder: C.A. Franke
- Dissolution: 1917

The Franke family was an important Prussian family of Bromberg, whose members were entrepreneurs, industrialists and businessmen from the 1820s to the eve of the First World War. Some of their edifices are still standing today in the city.

== Franke's family members ==
=== Carl August Franke ===
Carl August Franke arrived in Bromberg in 1827 from Leszno, together with his wife Caroline Keymer. He established a distillery business, the C.A. Franke Spiritusraffinerie with a modest capital of 500 thalers. The workshop was located at Bruckenstraße 10 (in today's Mostowa street). C.A. Franke died in 1853 in Bydgoszcz.

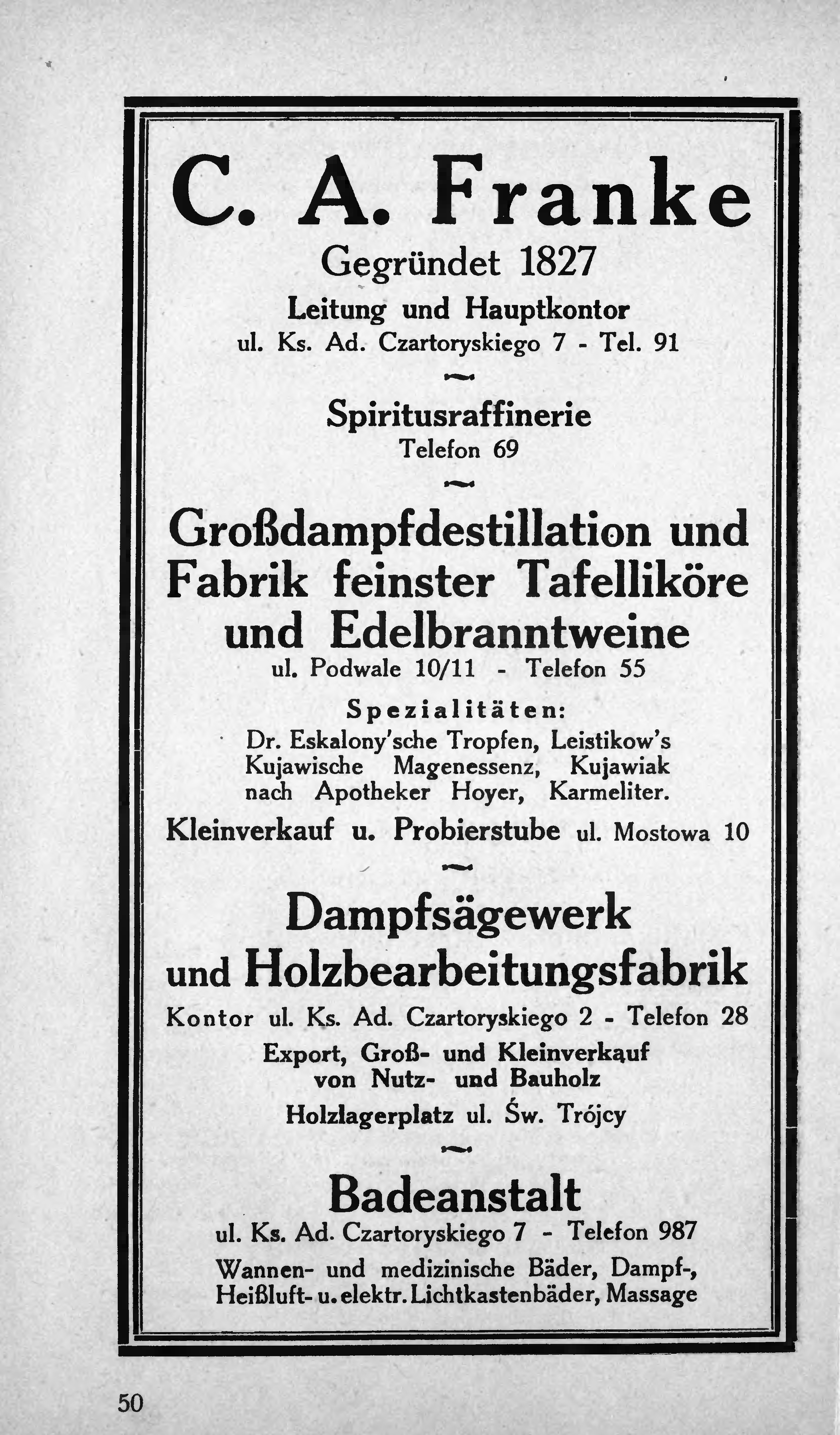
Advertising for CA Franke establishment ca. 1928

=== Hermann Franke ===
The son of Caroline and Carl, Hermann, was born on June 18, 1829, in Bydgoszcz. After the death of his father, the company passed into his hands. From that moment, the firm underwent a stable and dynamic development. In 1857, he had installed the first steam engine in the city with a 3 HP strength produced by Friedrich Eberhard's workshops in Berliner Straße. In 1872, he opened a new factory at Podwale Street 9 - Kręta 3 (now partly gone), for the production of liqueurs. Hermann Franke was known as a philanthropist, committed to work for economic, cultural and social development in the city: he was made in 1900, Honorary Citizen of the City of Bromberg. He died on July 29, 1913, in Bydgoszcz, and was buried in the Evangelical cemetery at Jagiellońska street (today's Ludowy Park).

His wealthy situation allowed Hermann Franke to engage in social and public activities. From 1858 to 1875, he was a member of the city council, and from 1875 to 1905, a benevolent city councilor. He gave to the city a fund of 60 000 German gold marks for the construction of:

- a nursing home;
- a shelter for blighted poor people;
- an evangelical church in the city.

He also gave scholarship funds for high school students.

In 1896, he was appointed commercial counselor by state authorities and in 1903, secret commercial adviser. Between 1876 and 1906, he was the president of Bromberg Chamber of Commerce established in 1875. With a passion for local history, his personal collection of archaeological and historical craft laid the foundations for the collections of Bydgoszcz Municipal Museum.

Hermann Franke was married to Minna, née Elsner. He had two sons:

- Georg Hermann Karla (b. 1858), a professor at Technische Universität Berlin;
- Konrad Moritz Ernst (1865–1917), a city councilor.

He lived in Bydgoszcz at Mostowa street 10.

=== Konrad Franke ===
After Hermann Franke's death, his son Konrad inherited the management of the entire company. He ran the business only four years, as he died prematurely in 1917, at age 52.

== Frankes' realizations ==
=== Spirit refinery ===
The company set up by Carl August in 1827, really developed when his son Hermann was in charge. The steady success meant that new steam-operated machines with a 1000 L capacity were set up in 1857. The growth of the population and the increasing demand for liqueur led Hermann Franke to look for alternate locations where to expand his activities. To that end, he acquired in 1872, plots at Wallstraße 11 (today's Podwale Street) to build a new factory with a daily production capacity of 3500 litres. In the 1880s, it was one of the first industrial place to be equipped with electrical-powered light in the city.

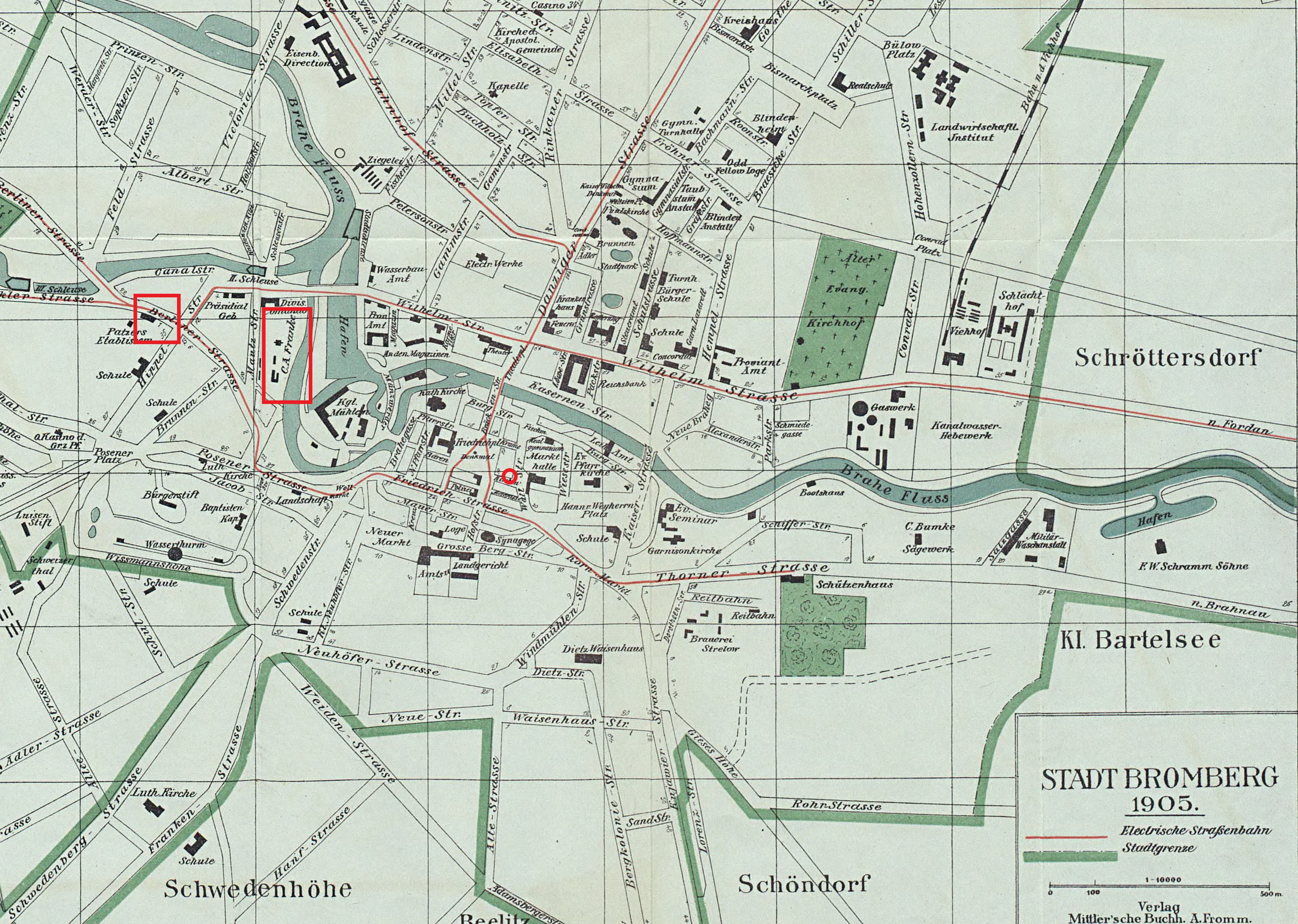
Frankes' facilities in 1905

The colossal increase of sales required the storage of larger and larger amounts of raw alcohol within the facility downtown (Wallstraße). Consequently, Hermann bought in winter 1887, a parcel that used to house a bankrupt saw mill and carpentry workshop belonging to late Heinrich Mautz, located at today's Czartoryskiego street. Soon, iron tanks and cisterns were erected there, holding up to a million litres of raw spirit. Afterwards, a warehouse was also built in 1893, increasing the storage capacity to 1.75 million litres, together with a state-of-the-art alcohol refinery. The company total daily production of refined alcohol subsequently reached 10,000 litres. At that time, the firm employed almost 30 people and its working capital attained about 750 000 German gold marks. The plant operated through the interwar period and the German occupation period, but under German ownership. After World War II, the factory has been nationalized and gradually ceased its activity.

=== Saw mill factory ===
In 1901, together with his son Konrad, Hermann Franke founded a steam sawmill factory with timber trade at today's Czartoryskiego street (then Wallstraße). The company sold initially wood in Bydgoszcz and the surrounding area. The plant comprised two steam boilers and a steam engine with several circular saws and planers, as well as bunging and grooving machines. Thanks to its convenient location in the city, the small scale workshop (30 employees) shifted to a larger business trading beyond the province borders.

This success called for a significant extension of the facility in terms of wood stocking area; to answer this need, a suitable terrain was leased, then purchased, at the third lock on the Brda river, next to the then famous Patzers Establissement (now gone, located at Swiętej Trojcy street 31–33). At its heyday, as a result of an ever-increasing demand, the company introduced 24h-operations, with day and night shifts for its 65 workers, so as to fully exploit the production capability of the plant. Hermann Franke shared the management of the wood firm with his son Konrad from 1897 onwards: the trade business reached as far as Berlin, Oldenburg and into Saxony. They had two shops in town, one at Mostowa street 10 (Franke's home), the other at Gdańska street 19.

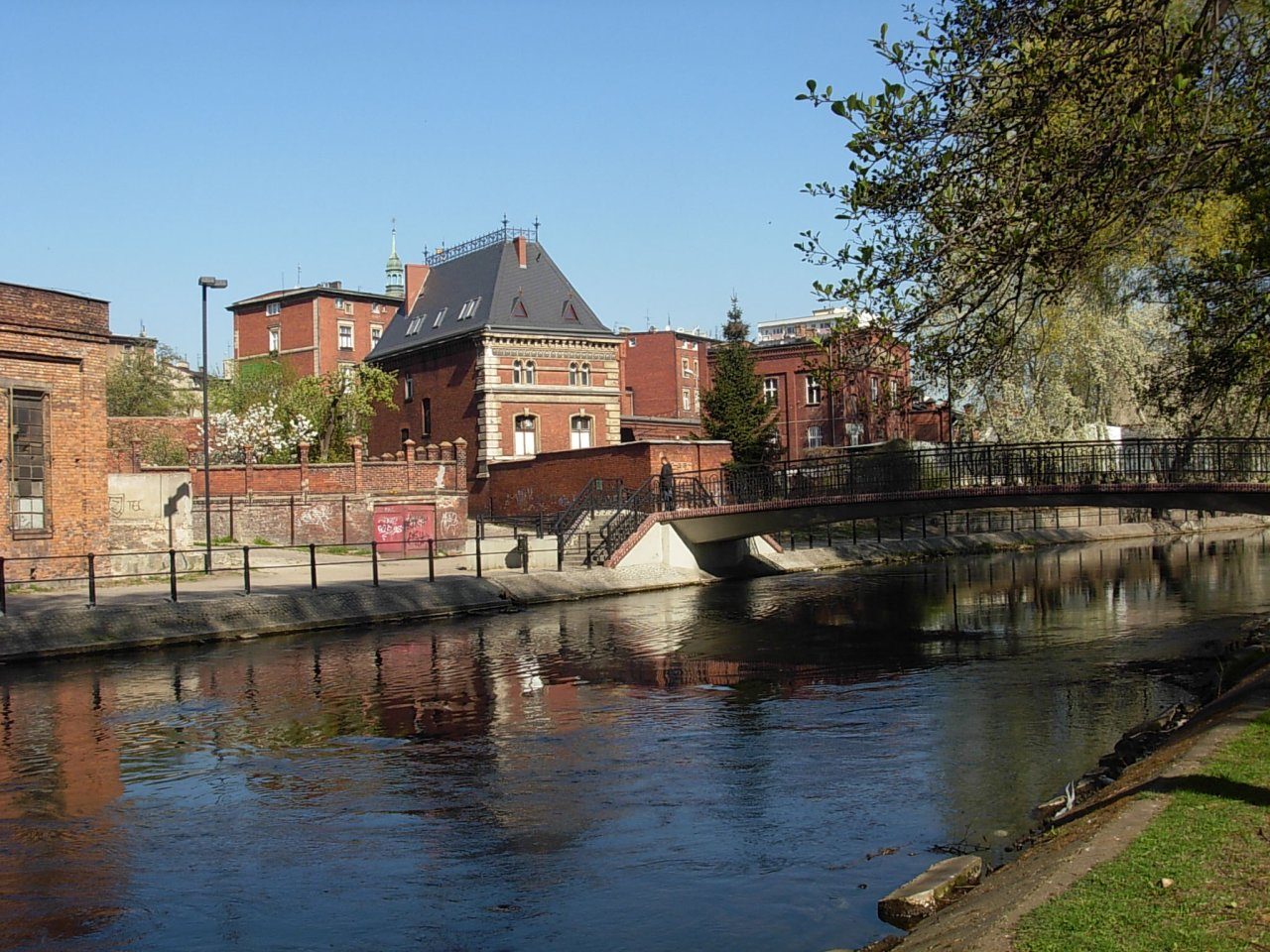
Current view of Franke's buildings in Bydgoszcz

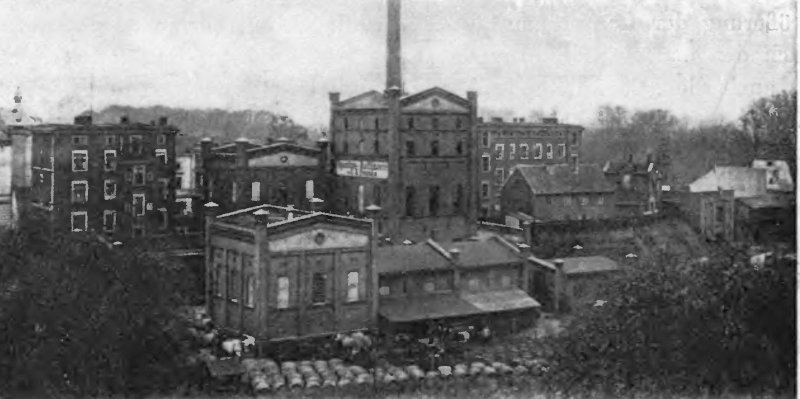
View of Franke's facility ca. 1907

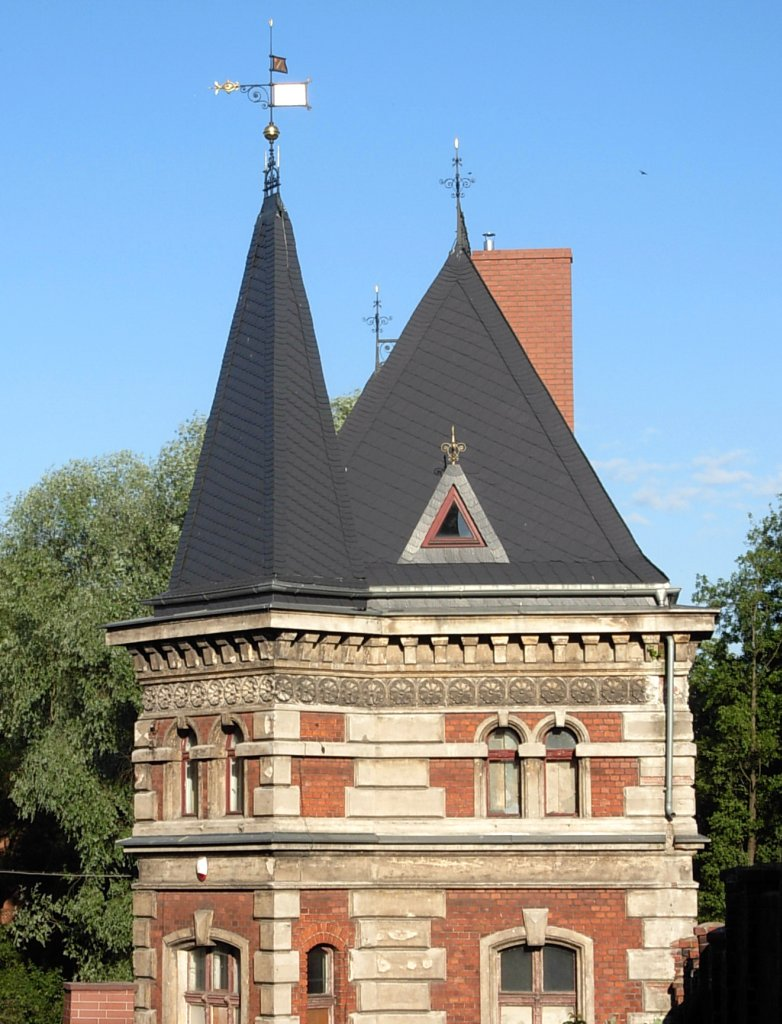
Detail of a turret

=== Bath house ===
In the process of making liqueurs, an important quantity of hot water was being produced and recycled to the benefit of public bathing establishments set up by the Franke's company. They were located both at Schloss Straße 16 -at the corner of today's Podwale and Grodzka Streets- (from 1874) and at Mautzstraße -today's Czartoryskiego street- (from 1894). During many years, these bathing houses were the only ones downtown to meet the needs of the Bromberg residents. With the development of the urban water network, facilities gradually lost their importance after WWI. The bath house at Czartoryskiego housed twelve cabins with bathtubs (1st class) and showers - separate for men and women. The equipment was dismantled in 1935, when the Franke family immigrated to Germany, selling the property back to Polish buyers.

One can still notice on an outside wall of a courtyard at Czartoryskiego 6, a bas-relief called Children in a Bath reminding this period.

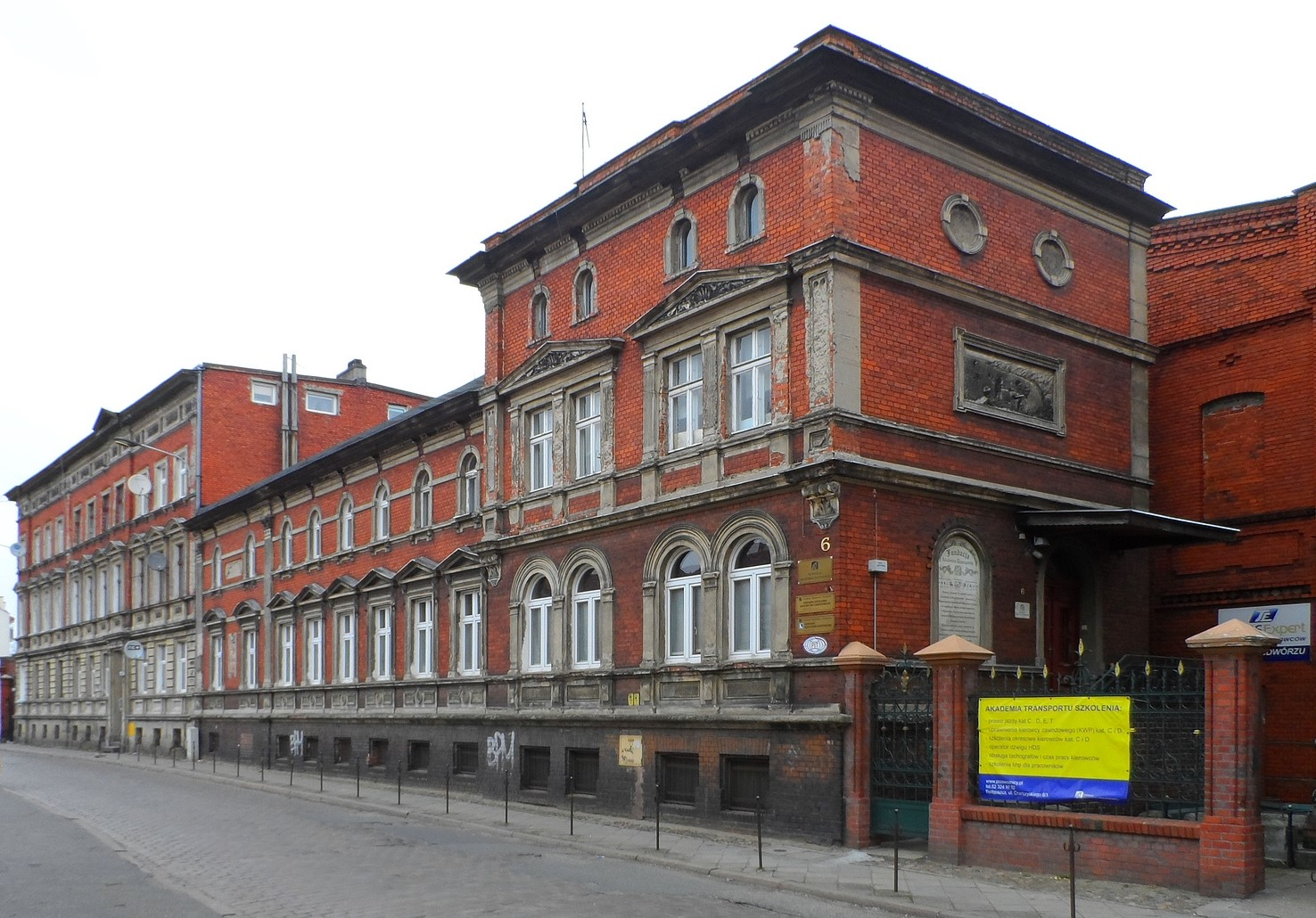
Facade of the facility on Czartoryskiego

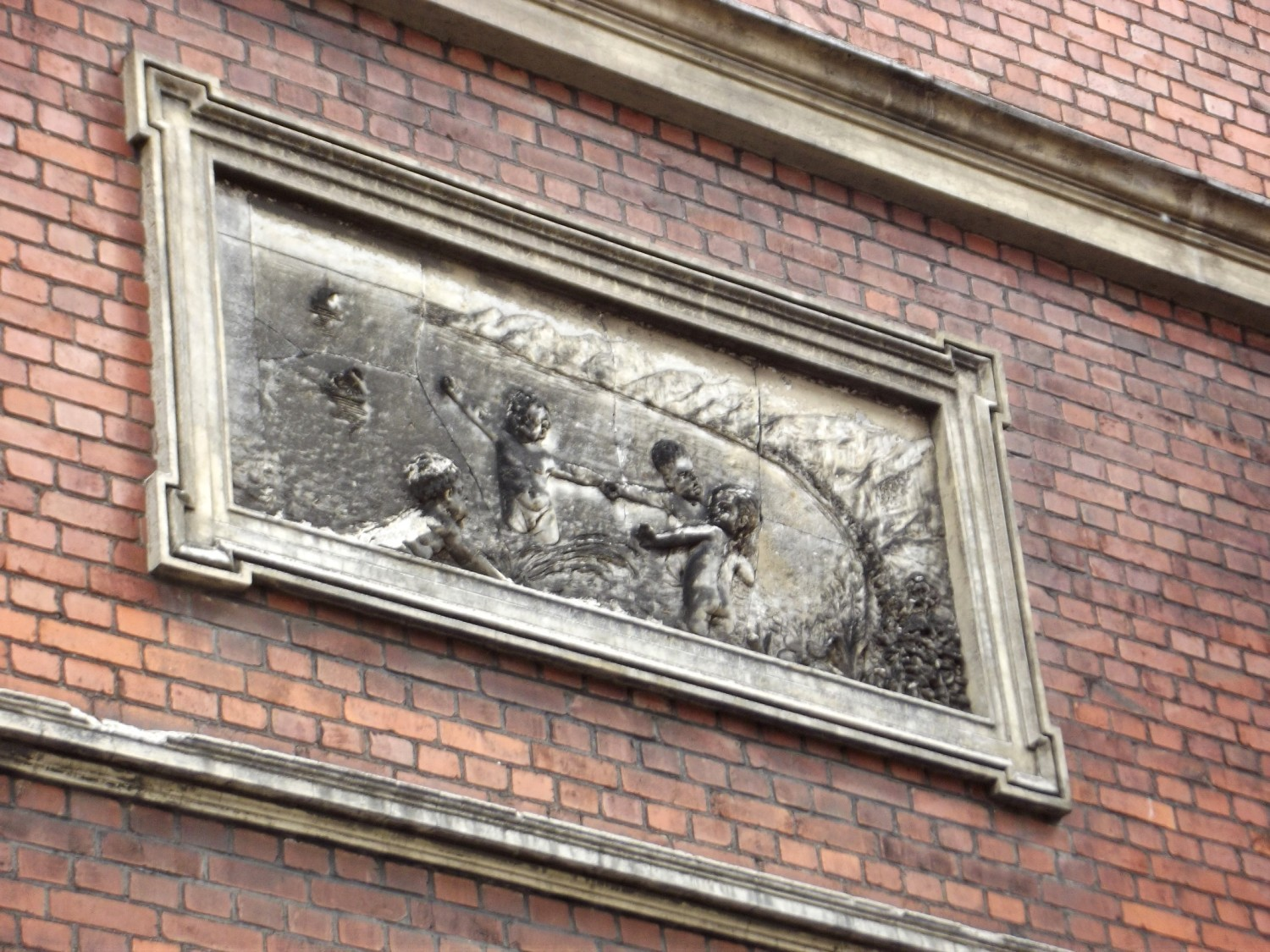
Children in a Bath bas relief

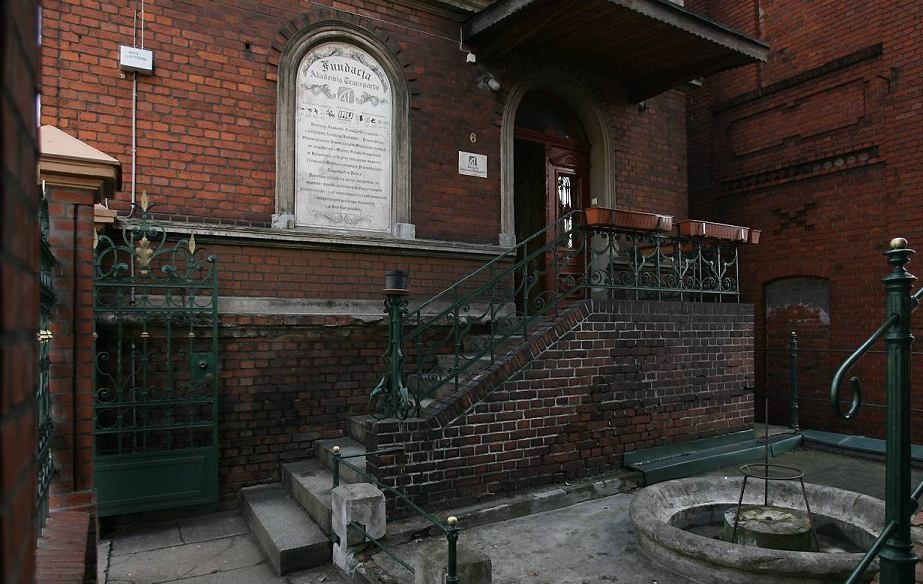
Entry to the former bath house

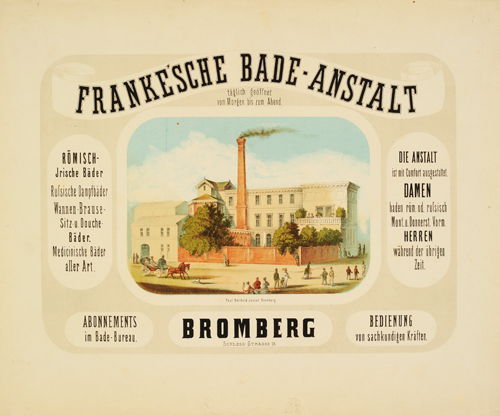
1928 advertising for Franke's bath house

== See also ==
- Blumwes' buildings in Bydgoszcz
- Mill Island in Bydgoszcz
- List of Polish people

== Bibliography ==
- Błażejewski Stanisław, Kutta Janusz, Romaniuk Marek (1994). Bydgoski Słownik Biograficzny. Tom I. Bydgoszcz (in Polish). Bydgoszcz: Kujawsko-Pomorskie Tow. Kulturalne. pp. 49–50.
- Błażejewski Stanisław, Kutta Janusz, Romaniuk Marek (1994). Bydgoski Słownik Biograficzny. Tom VI. Bydgoszcz (in Polish). Bydgoszcz: Kujawsko-Pomorskie Tow. Kulturalne. pp. 72–73. ISBN 83-85327-58-4.
- Böhm, Gewerberat (1907). Industrie und Gewerbe in Bromberg (in Polish). Bromberg: Dittmann. pp. 84, 126, 217, 243.
