= Adama Czartoryskiego Street, Bydgoszcz =

Street in Bydgoszcz, Poland

Adama Czartoryskiego Street
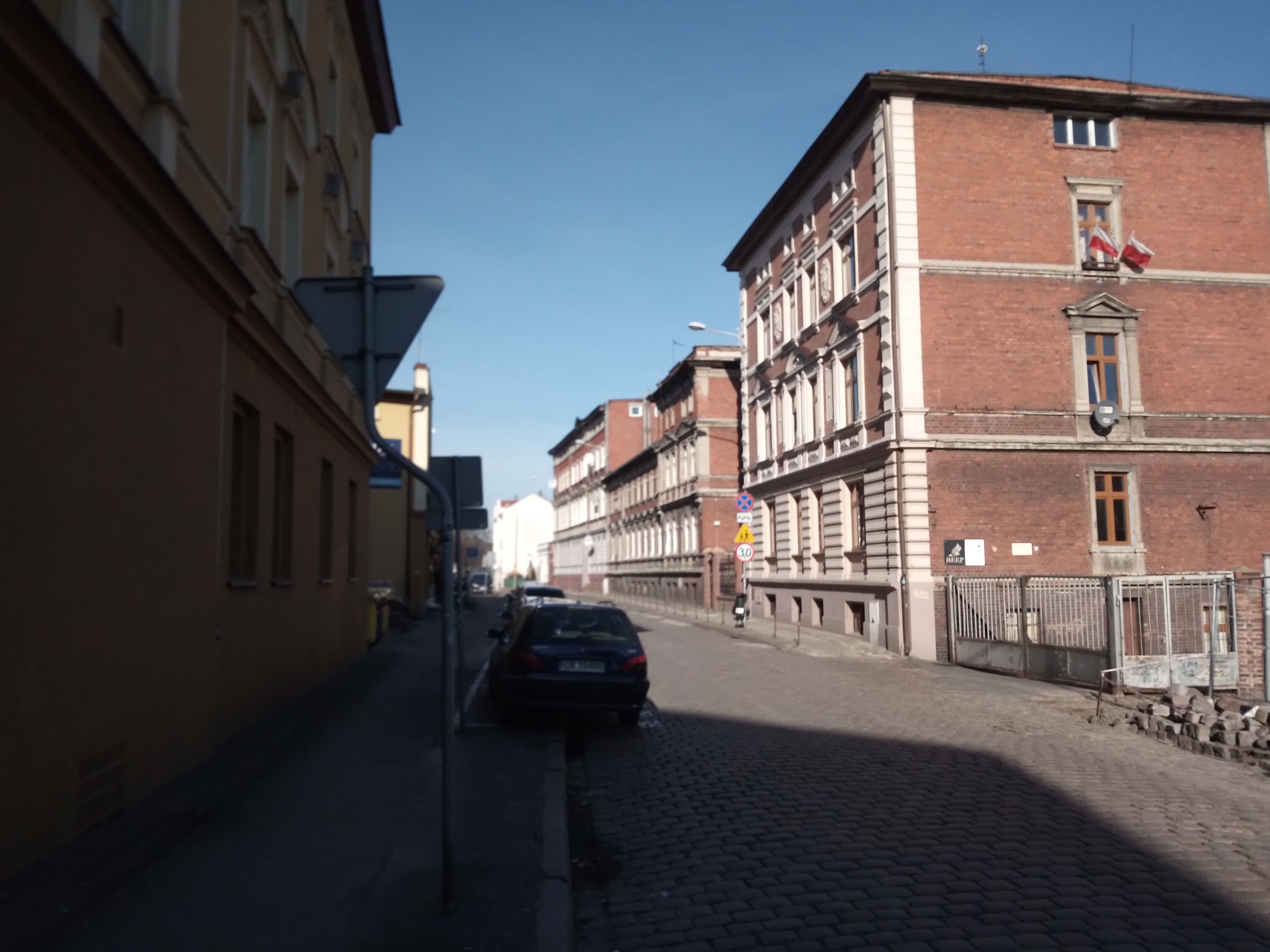
- Street view westward

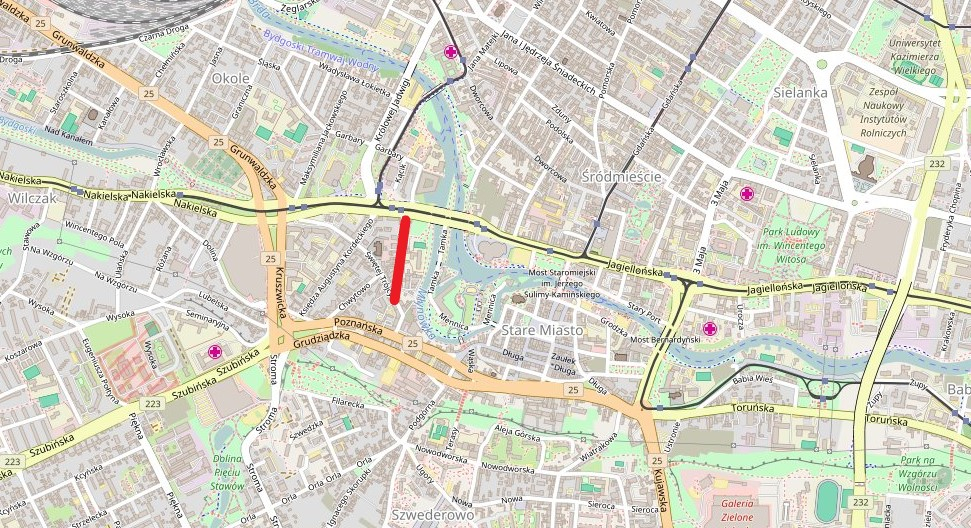
- Czartoryskiego street highlighted on a map
- Native name: Ulica Adama Czartoryskiego w Bydgoszczy (Polish)
- Former names: Mautz Straße, Holz Straße
- Part of: Old Town district
- Namesake: Adam Jerzy Czartoryski
- Owner: City of Bydgoszcz
- Length: 300 m (980 ft)
- Width: c. 10 metres (33 ft)
- Location: Bydgoszcz, Poland
- Coordinates: 53°07′26″N 17°59′34″E

Construction
- Construction start: Late 1800s

Adama Czartoryskiego street or Czartoryskiego street is a path located in the Old Town District (Polish: Stare Miasto) of Bydgoszcz, Poland. It portrays the industrial development that the city witnessed in the middle of the 19th century.

== Location ==
Located in the old town, the street follows a south-to-north path: stemming from Swiętej Trojcy street, it reaches its northern tip at Focha street.

== History ==
A 1800 Map of Bromberg highlights a road parallel to the Brda river in the area, with less than a dozen plots built.

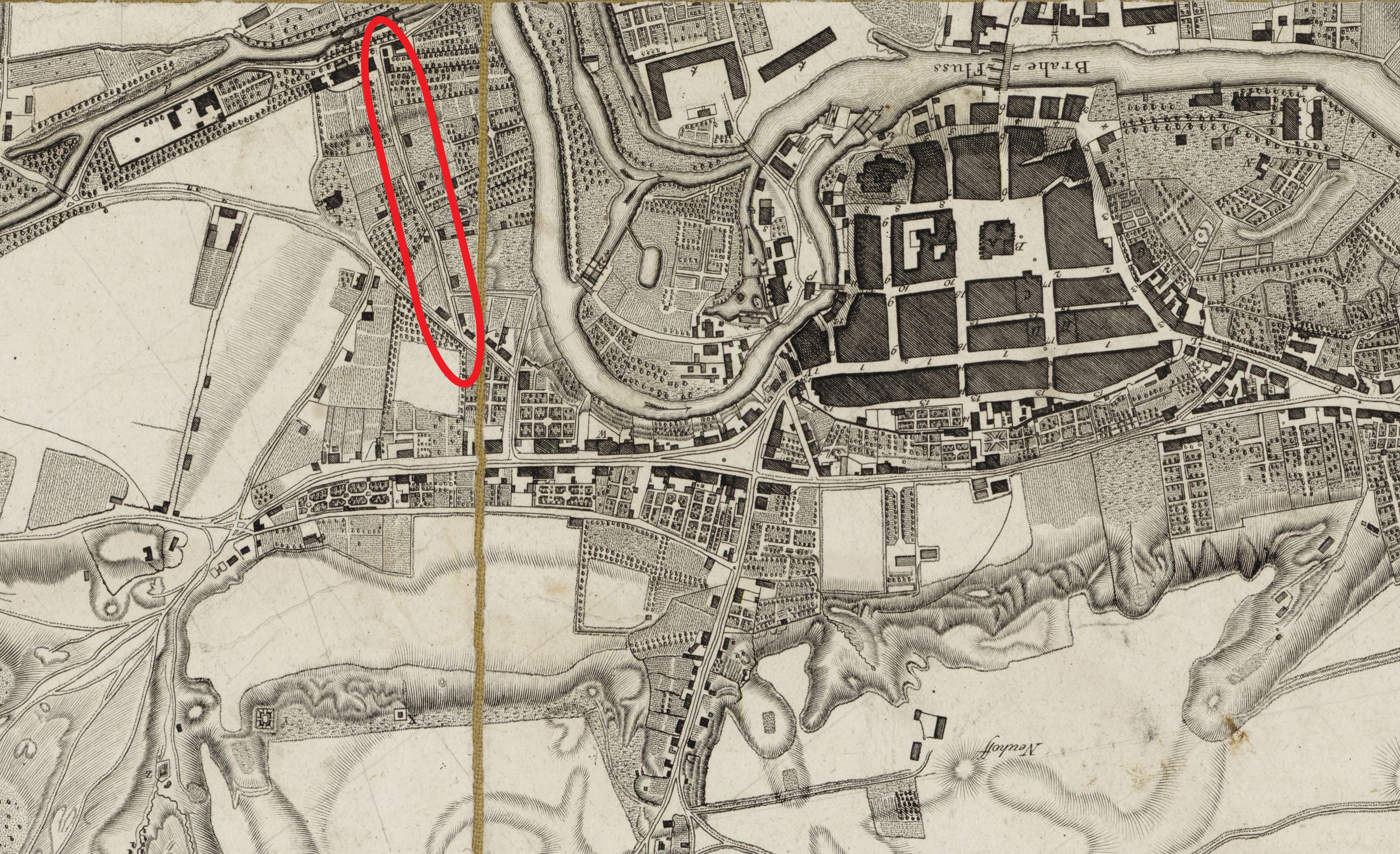
Lindner map of Bydgoszcz, ca 1800

The first address books of Bromberg, dated 1855, identifies the path as Holz Straße with 10 registered edifices, out of which three were the property of Henrich and Wilhelm Mauß.

=== Naming ===
During its existence, the street bore the following names:

- 1800s - early 1850s, not named;
- 1855 – 1875, Holzstraße, literally the Wooden road;
- 1876 – 1920, Mautz Straße in reference to the Mauß (also spelled Mautz) family who owned several houses in the street, as early as the 1850s;
- 1920 – 1939, Ulica Ks. Adama Czartoryskiego;
- 1939 – 1945, Mautz Straße;
- Since 1945, Ulica Ks. Adama Czartoryskiego (English: Prince Adam Czartoryski street).

The current name refers to Adam Jerzy Czartoryski (1770-1861), a Polish nobleman, statesman, diplomat and author. He was also a dedicated patron of arts and as such greatly contributed to the Czartoryski Collection. In 1798, he purchased one of Poland's most important national treasures – Leonardo da Vinci's Lady with an Ermine.

== Main areas and edifices ==
=== Tenement at 12 Swiętej Trojcy Street, corner with Czartoryskiego street ===
1890s

Eclecticism

This tenement at then Berliner straße 30, was the property of Wilhelm Baesler a smith master, who moved to Bromberg in the mid-1860s. The following landlord was also a smith, Julius Schmiede; his son Erich, a smith master, moved out in the mid-1920s, but lived in Bydgoszcz until the start of World War II.

Both elevations on the street have arc pedimented windows, and the facade on Świętej Trojcy also displays pilasters on its ends. A wrought iron gate parts the building, giving access to a backyard on Czartoryskiego street.

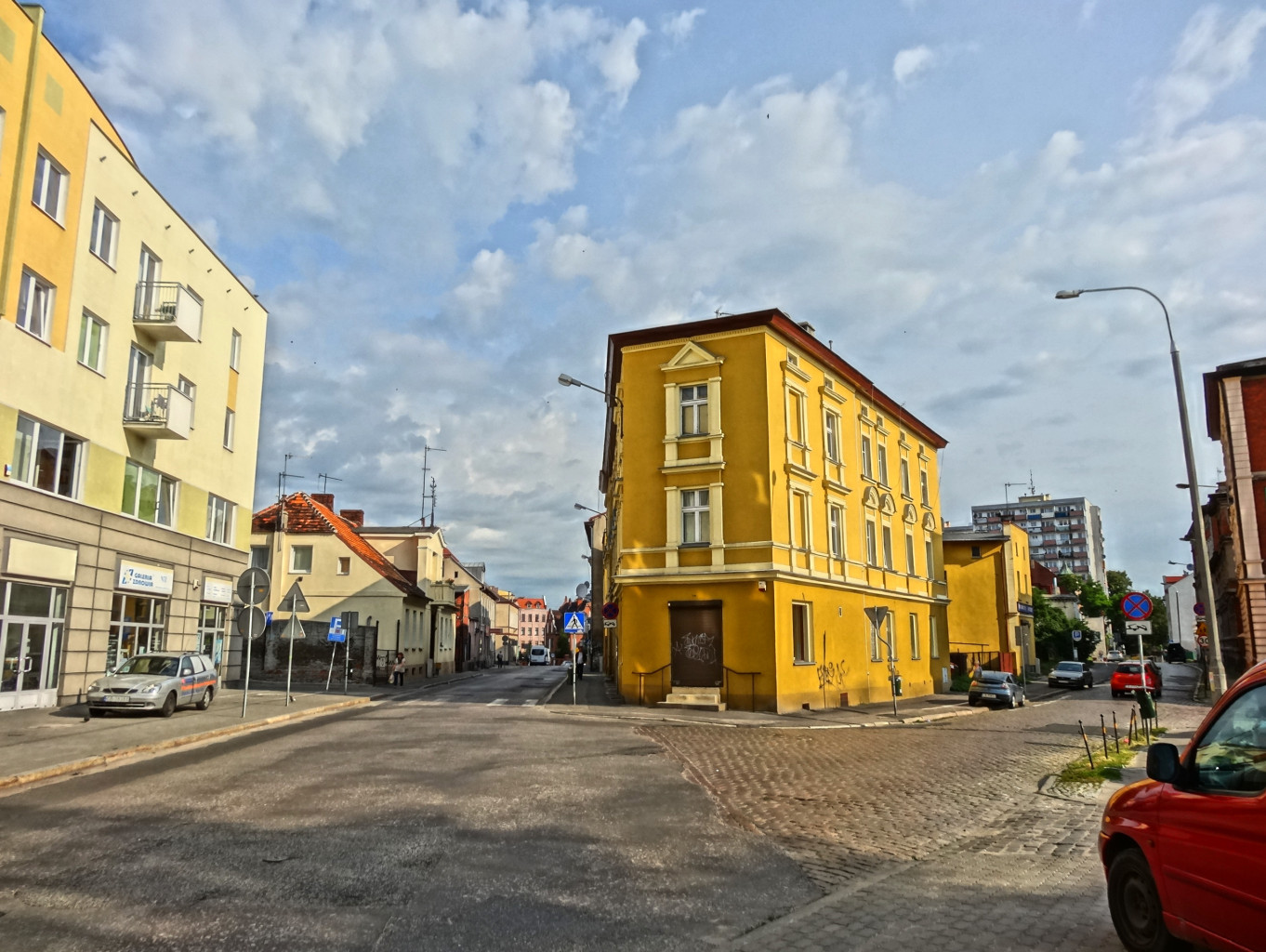
Corner house from the street

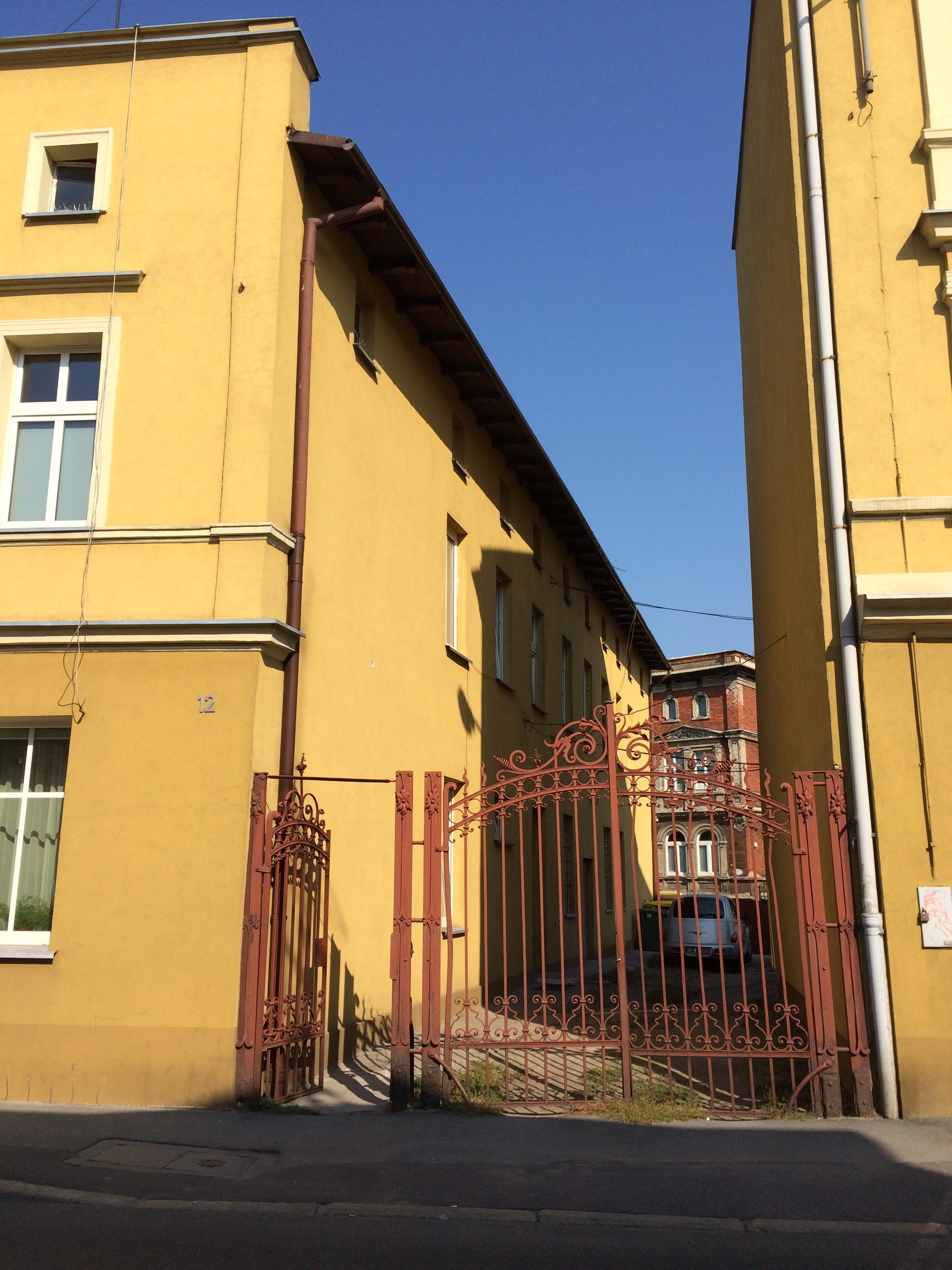
Wrought iron gate, with Franke's spirit refinery building in the background

=== Ancient iron foundry of Friedrich Eberhardt, at 2 ===
Industrial architecture

The building housed one of the oldest city plants, Friedrich Eberhard's machine factory and iron foundry, opened in 1846.

The company, known as Maschinenfabrik F. Eberhardt, installed in 1857, 3 horsepower (2.2 kW) steam engines in nearby Franke's distillery. A few years later, Eberhardt manufactured there more powerful steam engines, from 20 horsepower (15 kW) to 25 horsepower (19 kW) for local brick workshops.

The edifice has been put for sell in 2018.

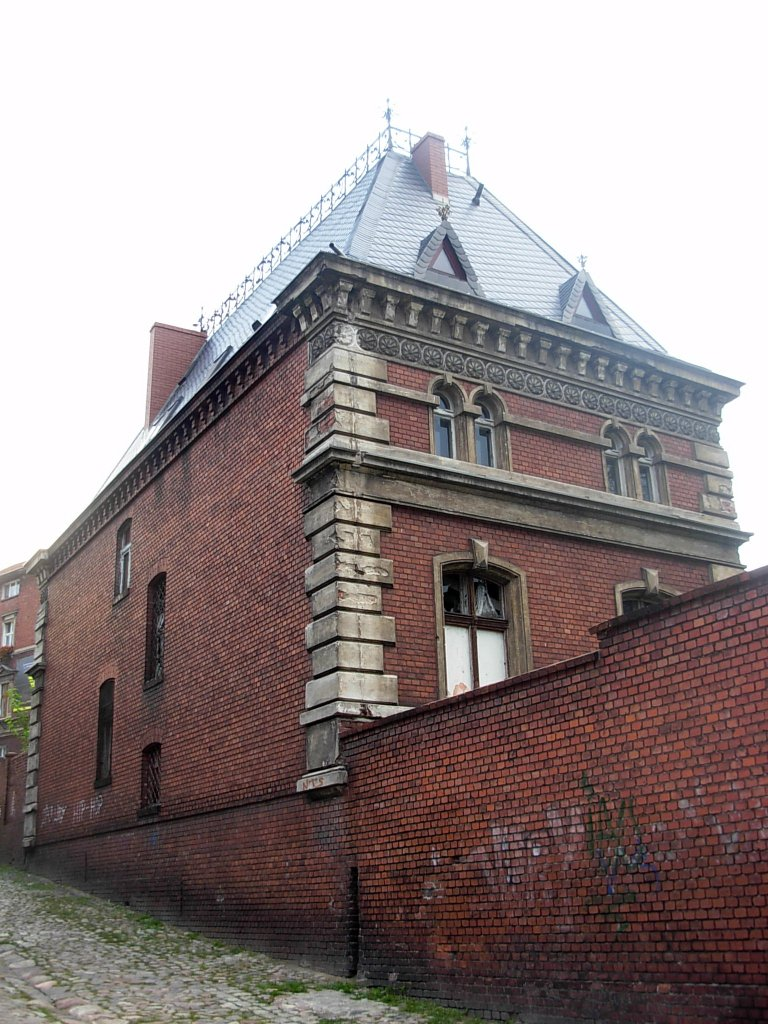
View from the Brda river

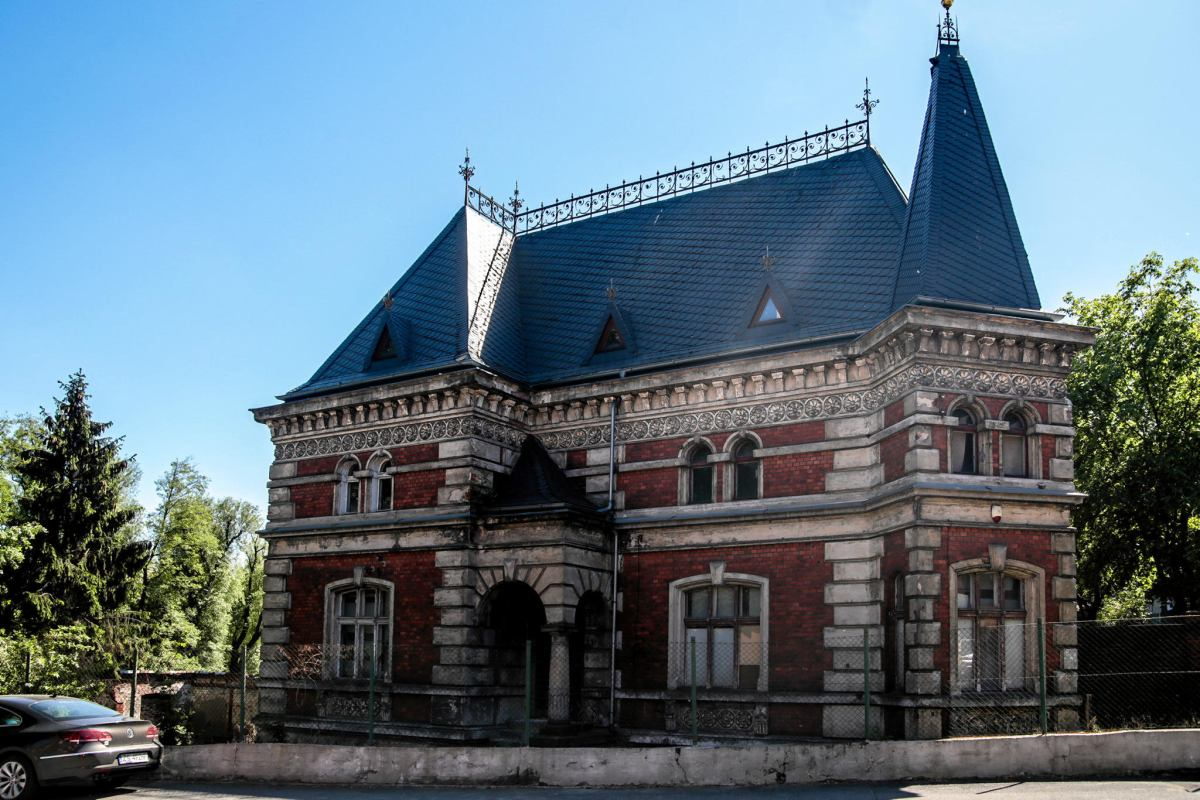
View from the backyard

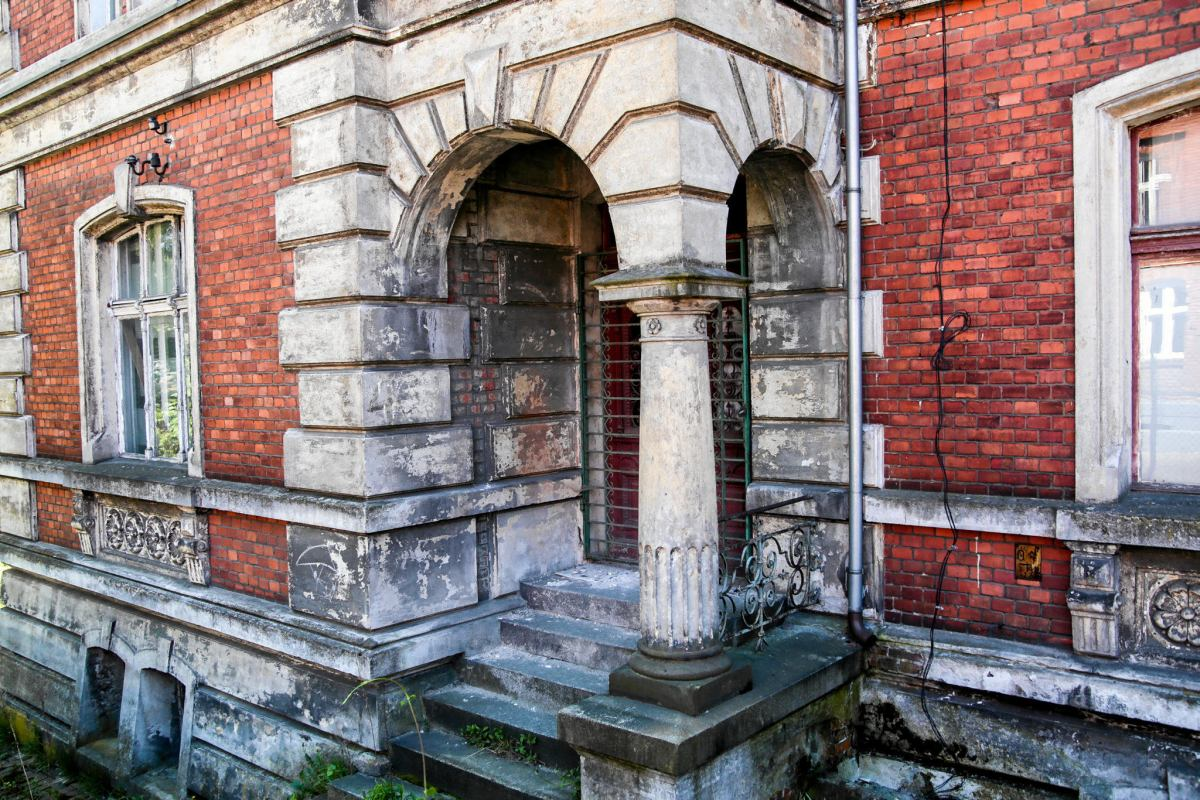
Entrance details

=== C.A. Franke's ancient spirit refinery, at 4/10 ===
1880s-1890s

Industrial architecture

Carl August Franke, the founder of the company, came to Bydgoszcz in 1827 from Leszno. At his death (1853), his son Hermann took over the management of the small family spirit distillery, making it a thriving factory.

After a first expansion of the workshops at Podwale street in 1872, the daily of spirit output reached about 3,500 liters. In order to solve the storage issue, Hermann purchased in 1887, a large plot of land at then "Mautz Straße", along the lateral stream bed of the Brda river. The spirit warehouse erected there was equipped with cement cisterns and iron tanks, capable of holding about 1 million liters of spirit (increased shortly to 1.75 million liters).

In 1893, a large and modern refinery factory was added beside the warehouse: together, both plants (the newly built one and the old one on Podwale street) enabled a daily production of 10,000 liters of spirit.

At that time, the firm employed almost 30 people and its working capital attained about 750 000 German gold marks. The plant operated through the interwar period and the German occupation period, but under German ownership. After World War II, the factory has been nationalized and gradually ceased its activity.

Public baths were set up by C.A. Franke:

- in 1874, on the Brda river, at the corner of today's Podwale and Grodzka streets;
- in 1894, on the lateral branch river, along Czartoryskiego street.

These facilities, located close to the refineries, used the hot water from the industrial liqueur process. During many years, these bathing houses were the only ones available downtown to meet the needs of the Bromberg residents. With the development of the urban water network, facilities gradually lost their importance after WWI. The bath house at Czartoryskiego housed twelve cabins with bathtubs (1st class) and showers - separate for men and women. The equipment was dismantled in 1935, when the Franke family immigrated to Germany, selling the property back to Polish buyers.

One can notice, a neo mannerist old office building at 6. In the adjoined courtyard there is a bas-relief called Children in a bath, recalling the period when baths used to stand here.

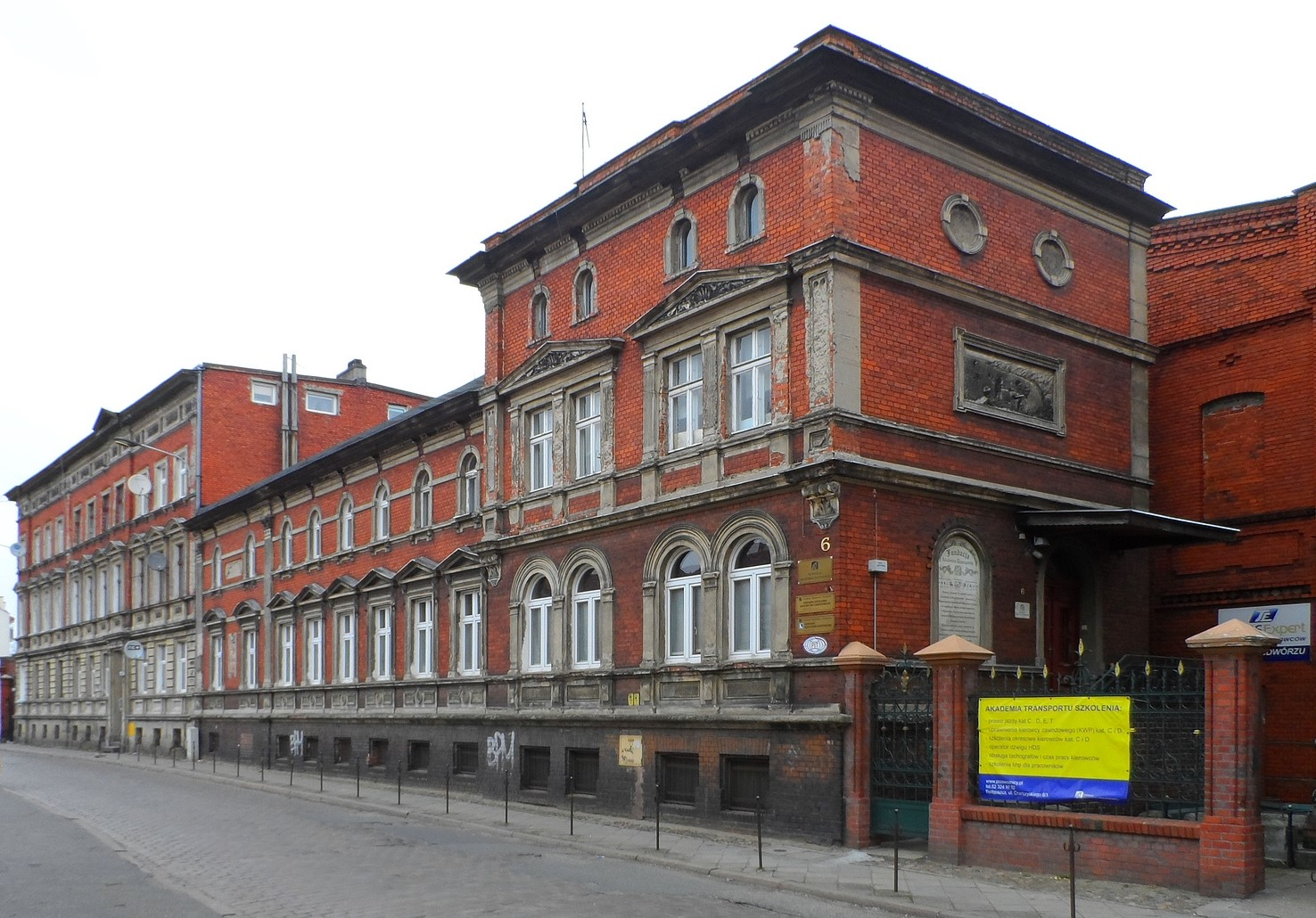
View of the buildings at 6/8/10

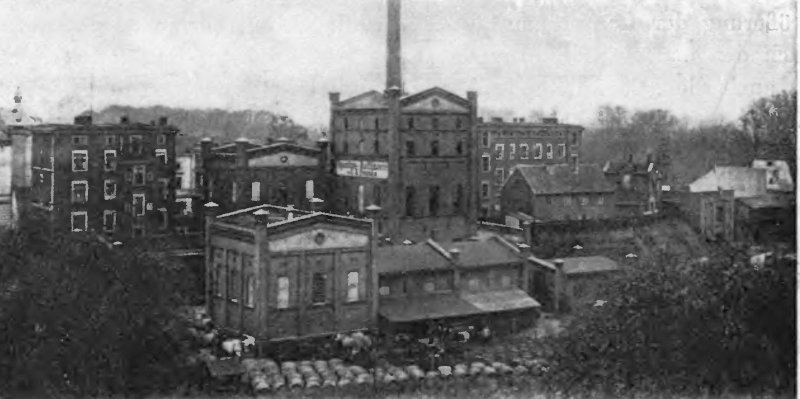
The refinery ca 1907

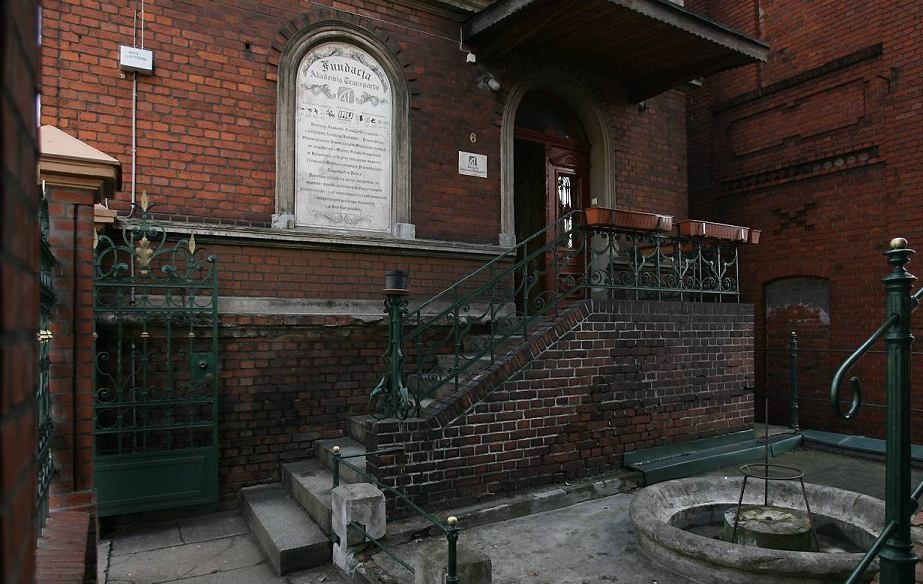
Entrance of the former baths at 6

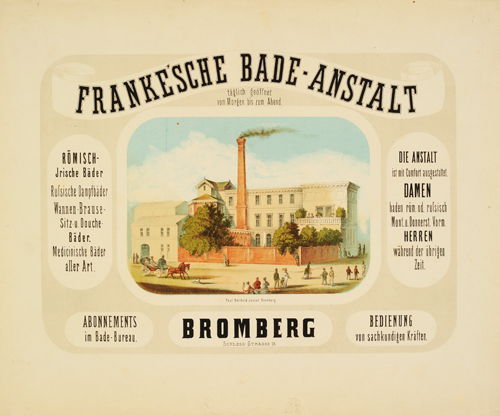
1928 advertising for the Franke bath house

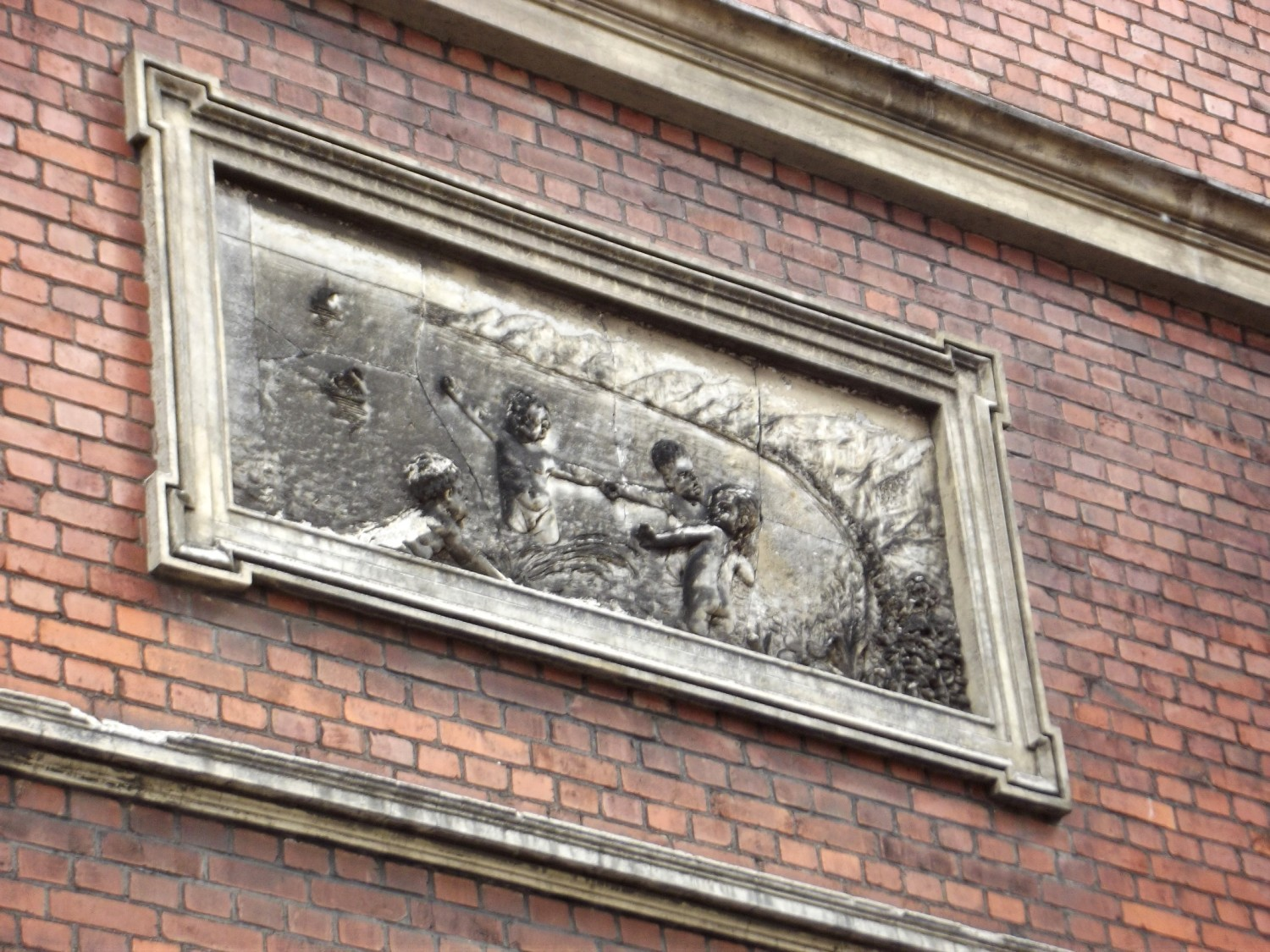
Bas-relief, "Children in a bath"

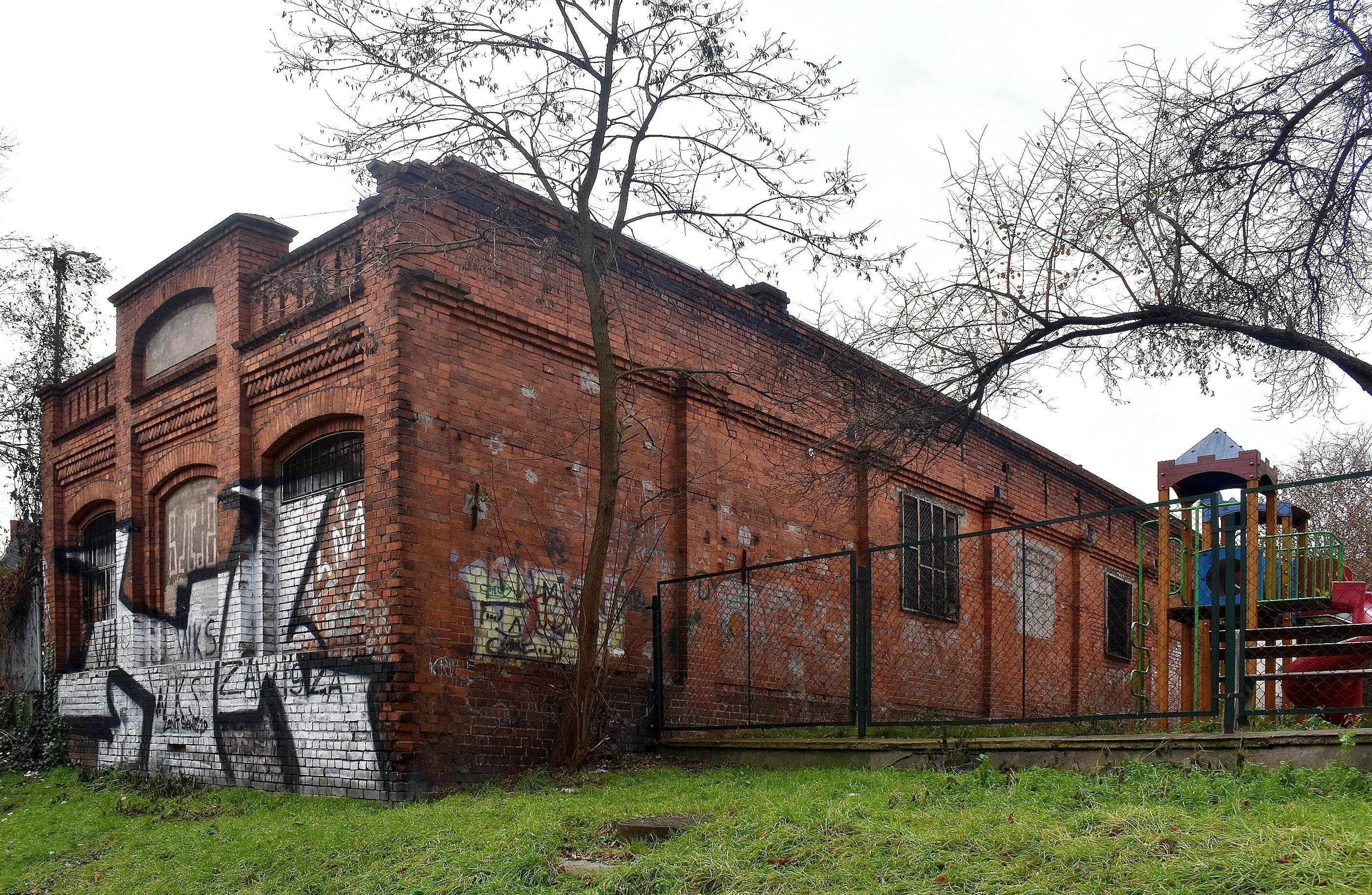
Back of the building at 8, view from the lateral river

=== Factory at 7 ===
Industrial architecture

The place used to harbour a workshop. Sold in 2019, the new owner plans to build there an hotel.

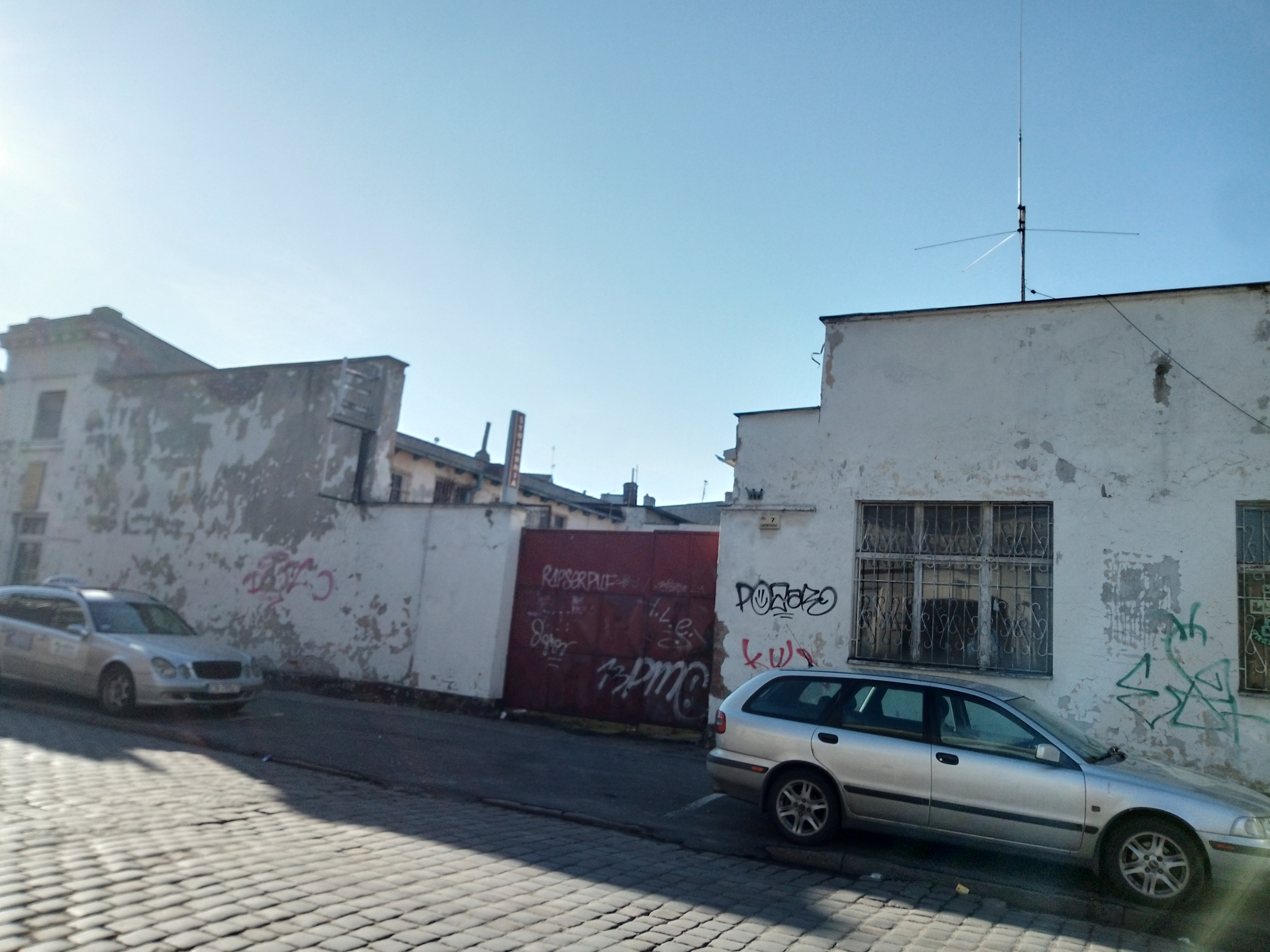
View from the street

=== Ernst Till Workshop, at 9 ===
Industrial architecture

In the mid-1880s, Ernst Till, a smith master, opened there his workshop. At the time, the plot was registered on "Berliner straße" (present day's Swiętej Trojcy Street). Ernst and his descendants owned the place until the 1930s.

Today, the plot is still opened on both streets; the path to Swiętej Trojcy Street leads to the parvise of the Church of the Holy Trinity.

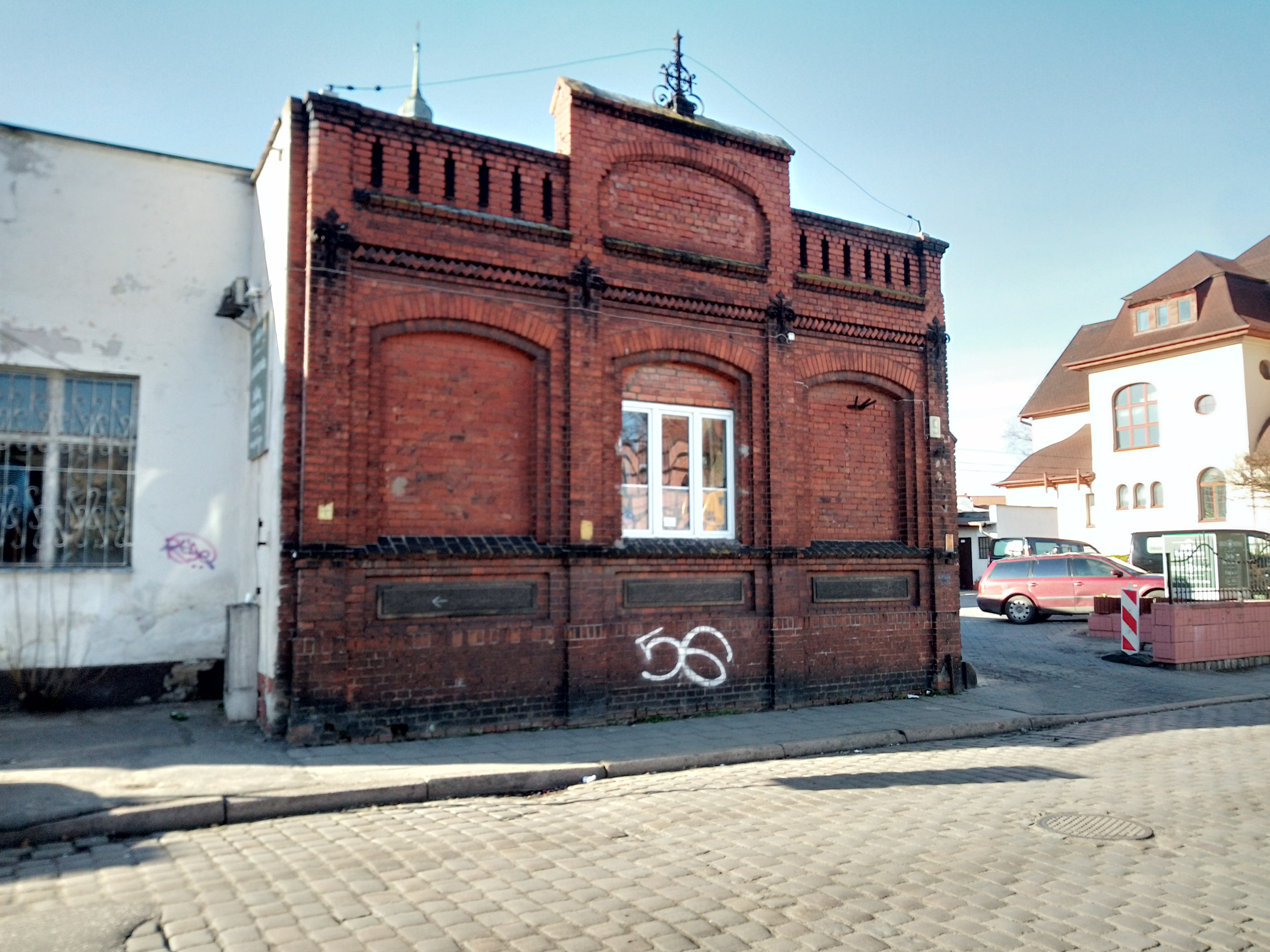
View from the street

=== "Betezda" charity mission house, at 12 ===
Early 1880s

Industrial architecture

The plot, then at "4 Mautz Strasse", was first owned by Heinrich Mautz in the 1850s, as located at "Holz Straße". In 1890, it became the property of the "C.A. Franke" company.

Since 2004, it has been housing a mission of the Congregation of the Baptist Church in Bydgoszcz, the "Centrum Chrześcijańskie KANAAN - Misja BETEZDA" (English: KANAAN Christian Center - BETEZDA Mission).

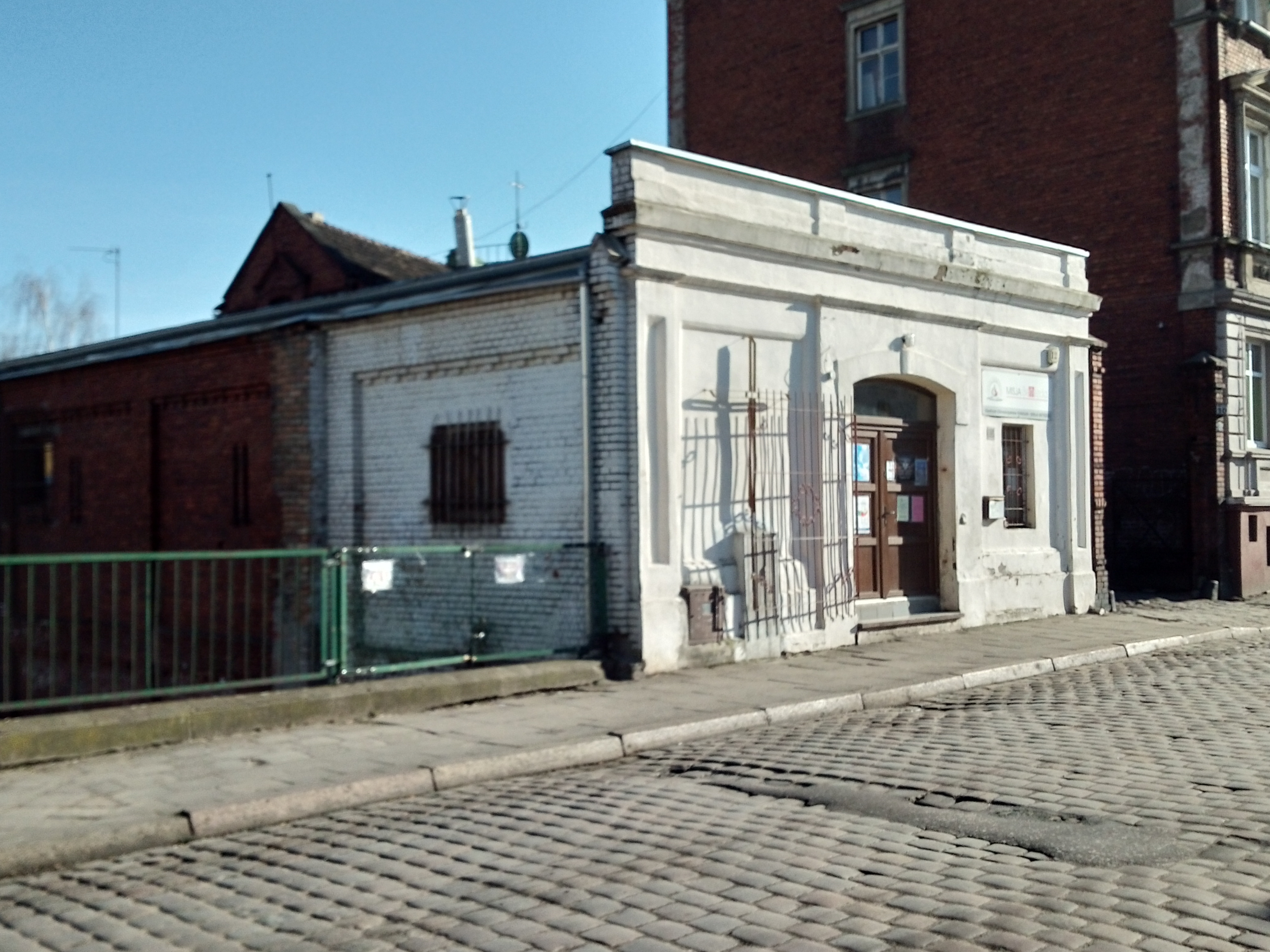
View from the street

=== Franke Villa at 13 ===
Beginning of the 20th century

Art Nouveau

The plot has been for a long time utilized as a garden. It's only in 1908 that Hermann Franke had this villa erected.

The building has Art Nouveau features and is noticeable by its corner tower topped with a cupola. The entrance porch bears the initial "CF" , in reference to Carl Franke, father of Hermann Franke. The edifice, till the 1980s, used to be the "Civilian Registry Office", especially for weddings. Currently, it hosts various institutions, including the local alliance of Trade Unions.

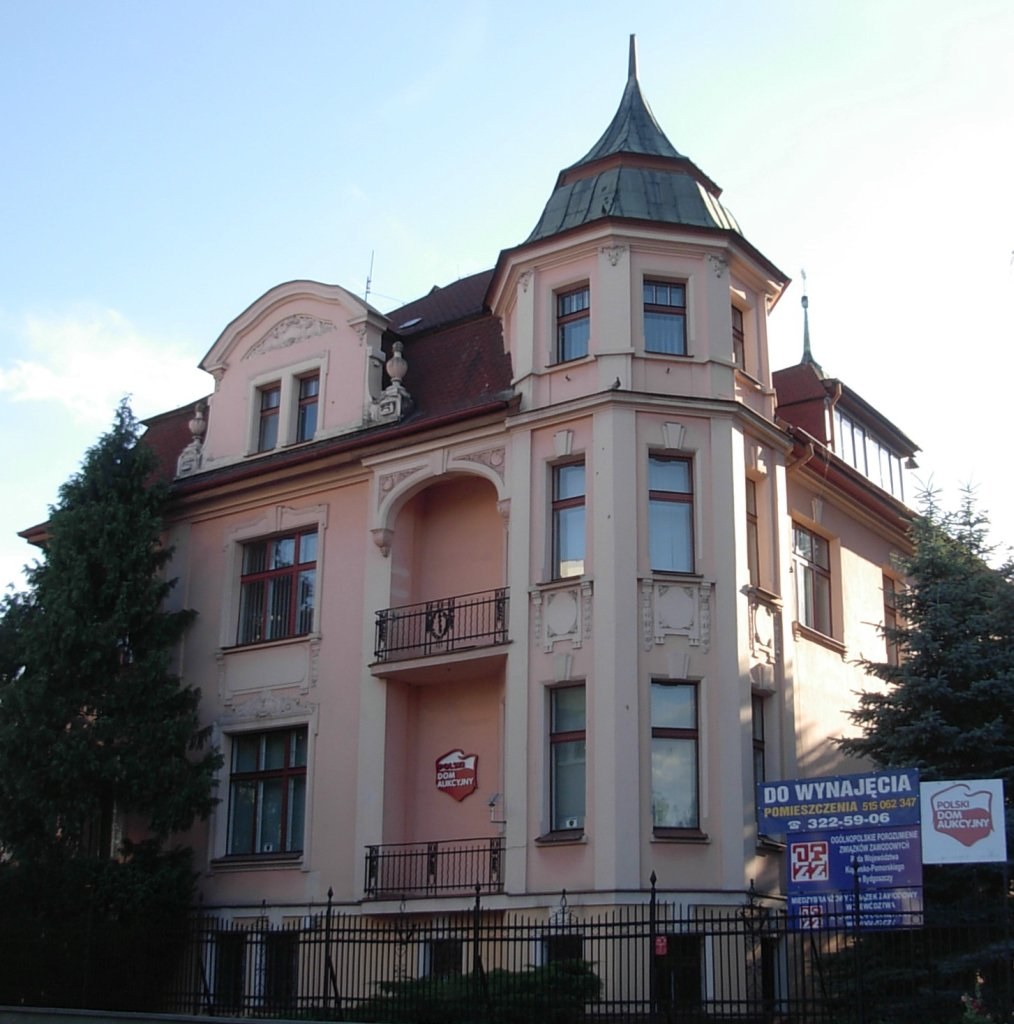
View from the street

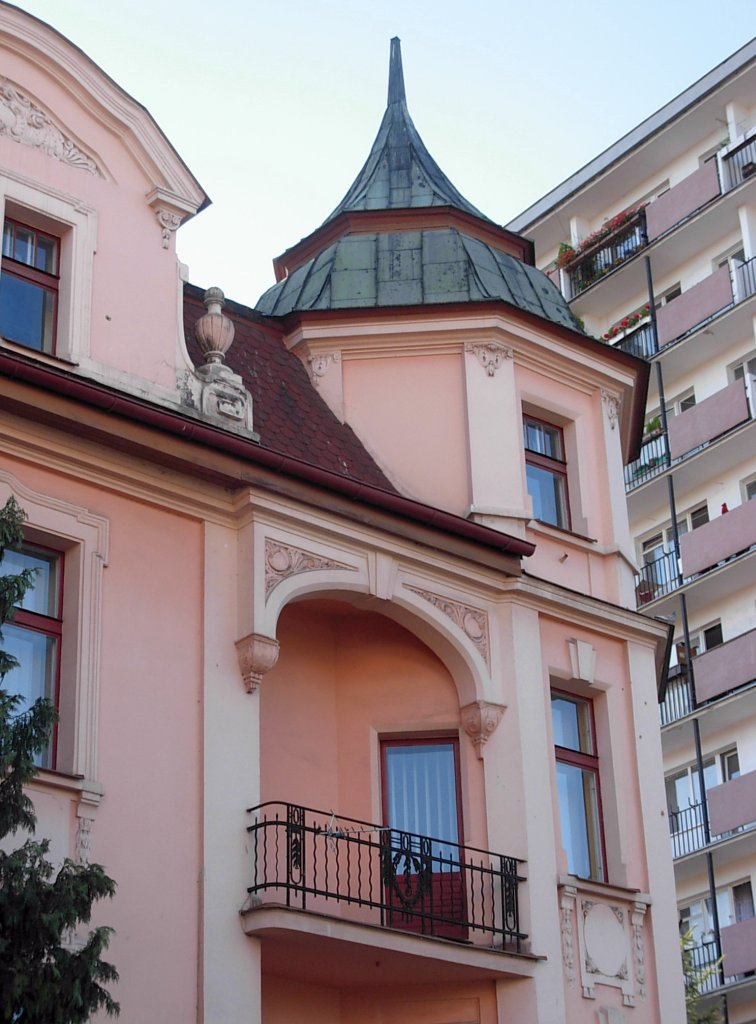
Tower detail

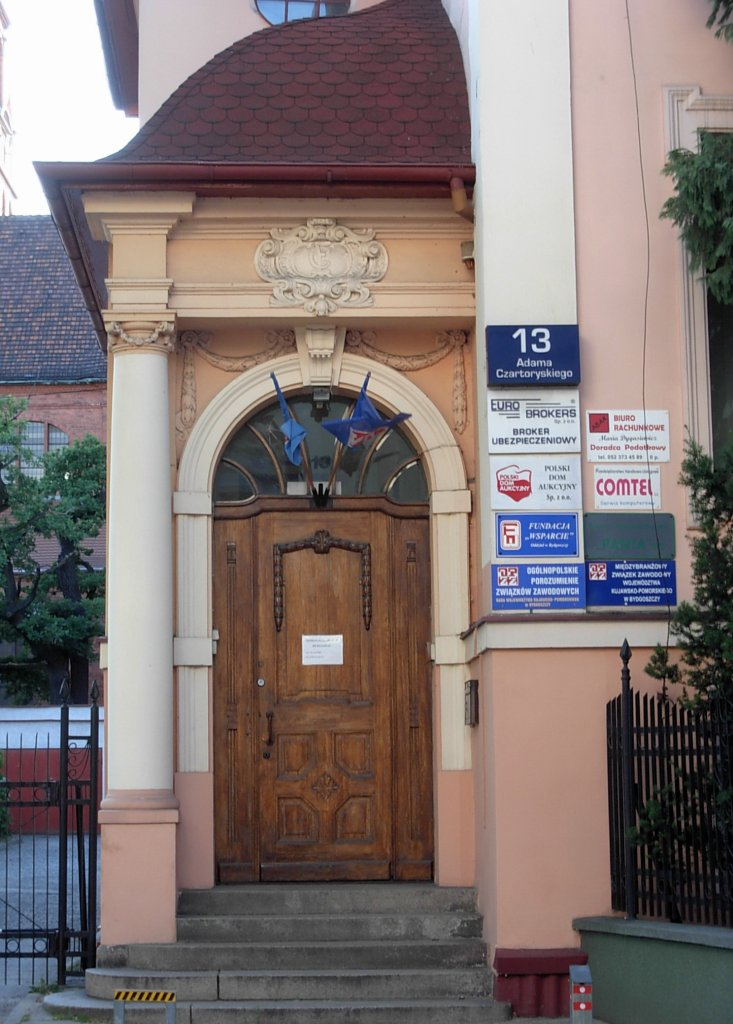
Main entrance

=== Buildings at 16 ===
Second half of the 19th century.

Wattle and daub

The plot presents a large early modernist building, giving onto the street.

The oldest edifice, however, is located at the back of the parcel and gives onto the river. It consists of a brick and wattle-and-daub house, supported by rocky foundations.

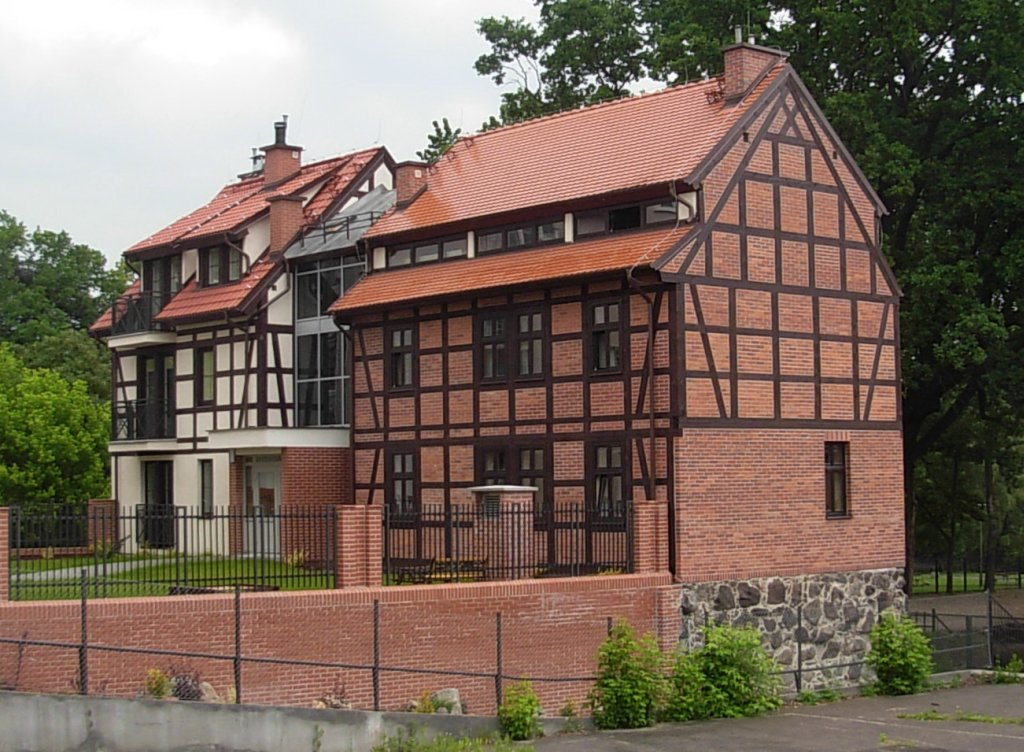
Wattle and daub house

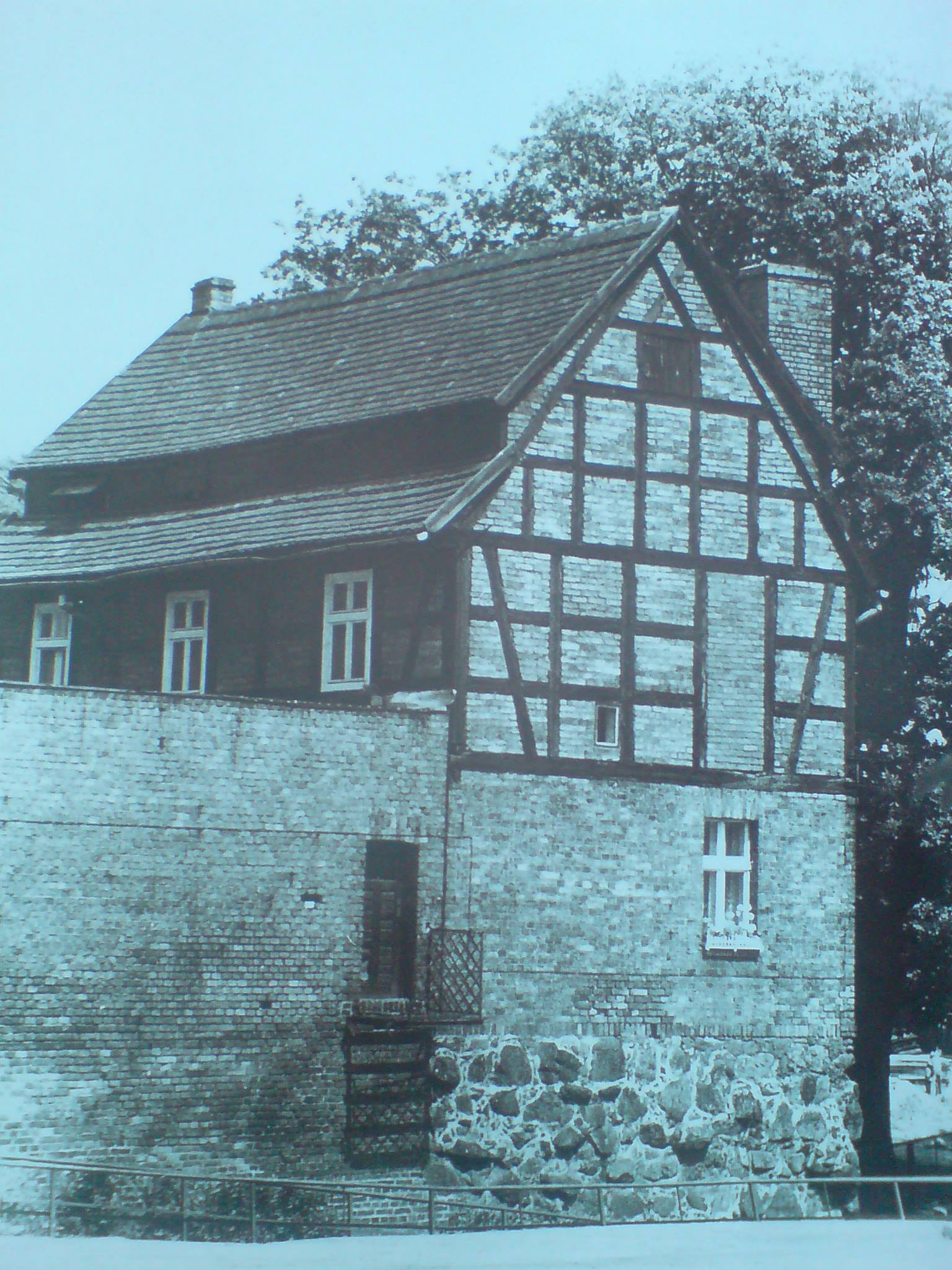
Early 20th century picture

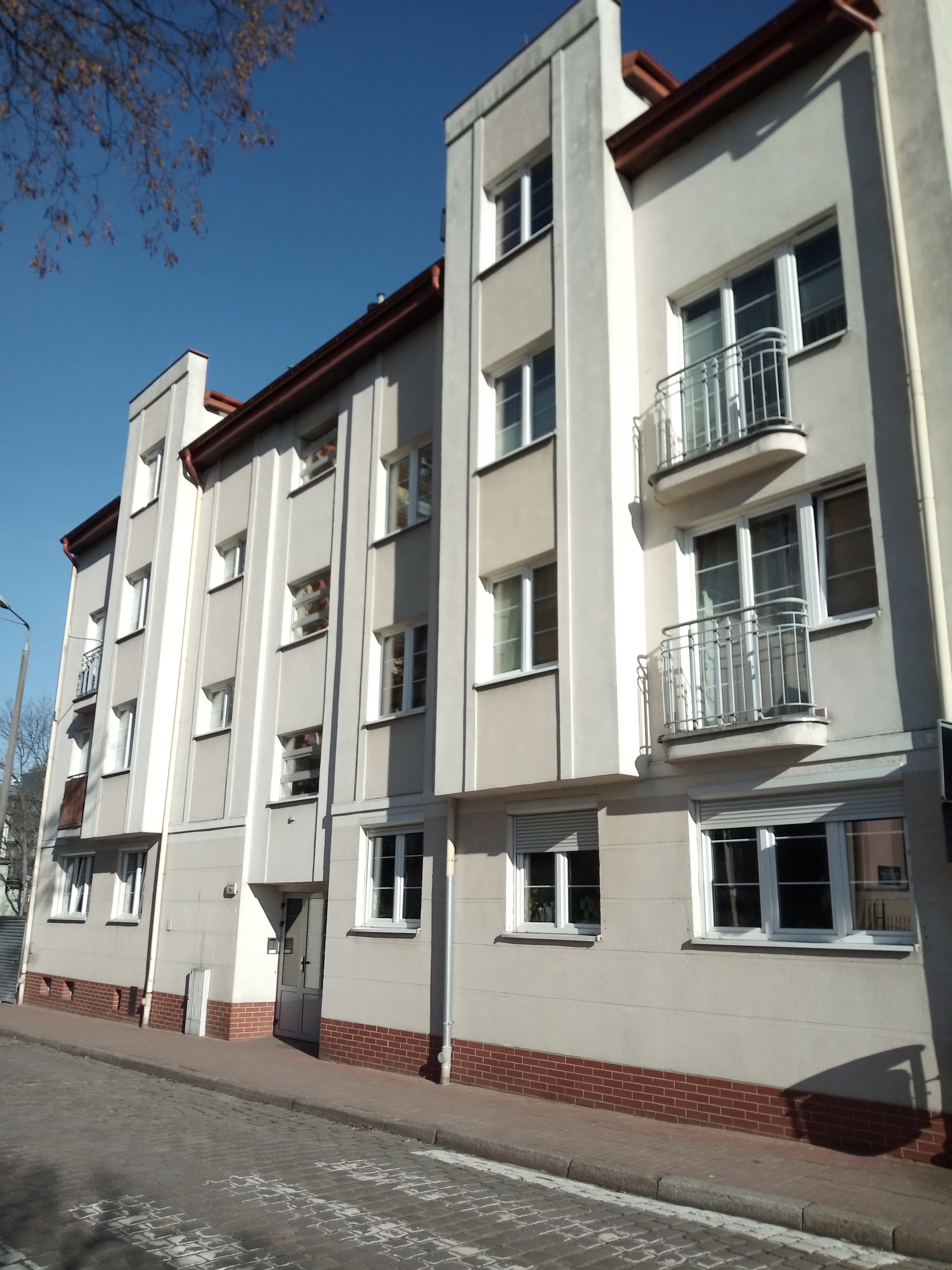
Main elevation on the street

=== House at 20, corner with Focha street ===
1855–1857, by Heinrich Mautz

Neoclassical architecture

The house at then Maußstraße 1 has been built by master carpenter Heinrich Mautz for his own use, as he owned a sawmill on the river. Since 1887, the villa housed the military general commanding the Prussian 4th Division billeted in Bromberg. After 1920, the place was owned by the State Treasury of Poland, housing there the general commanding the 15th Infantry Division: in the 1930s, general Wiktor Thommée lived there. During World War II, it was the HQ of the Nazi security forces: a plaque in memoriam has been placed. After World War II, it has housed a municipal branch of the city tax office (Polish: Izba Skarbowa).

The two-storey villa has got very neo-classical features, a set of identical windows one the ground floor and a series of smaller, square openings above. The entry gate on Czartoryskiego street has particularly well adorned lintel and pilasters.

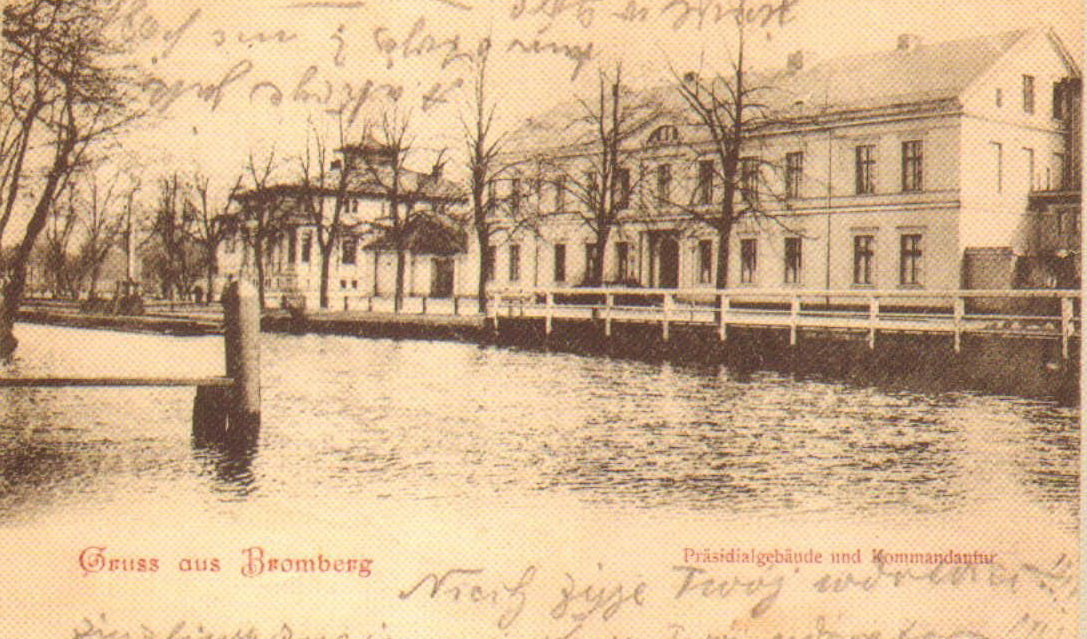
1900 view with the house on the left

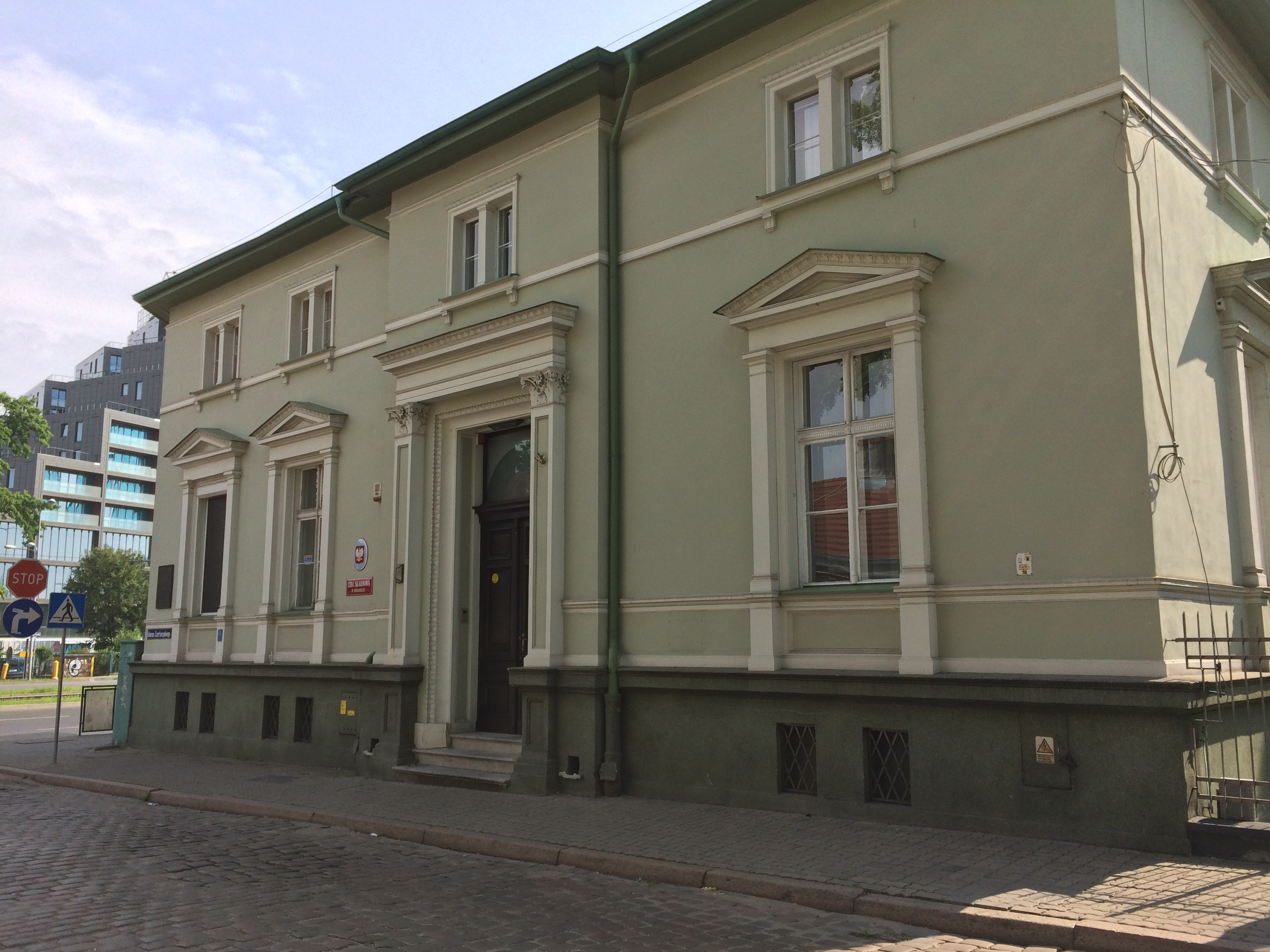
Facade on Czartoryskiego street

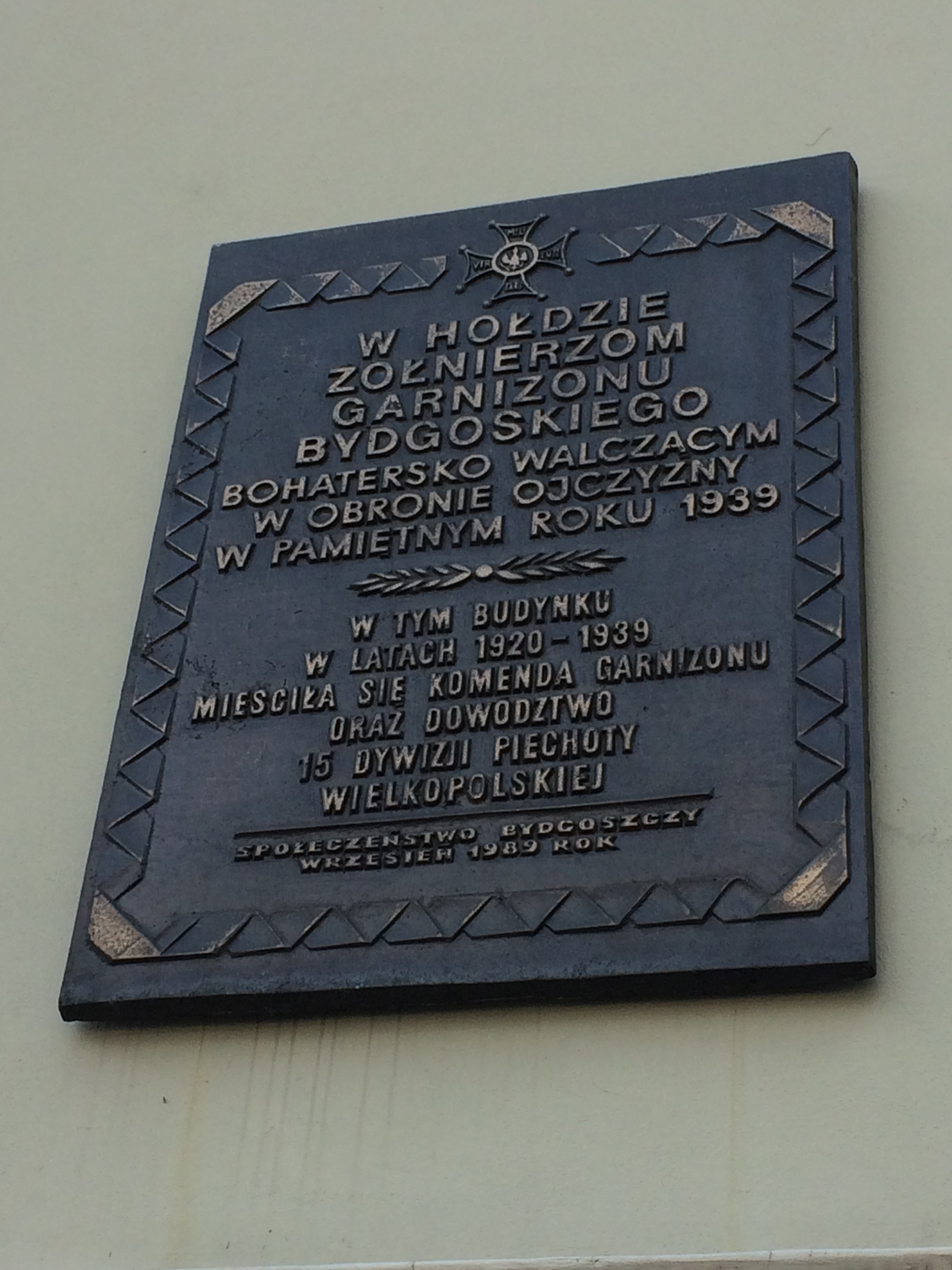
Plaque on the house

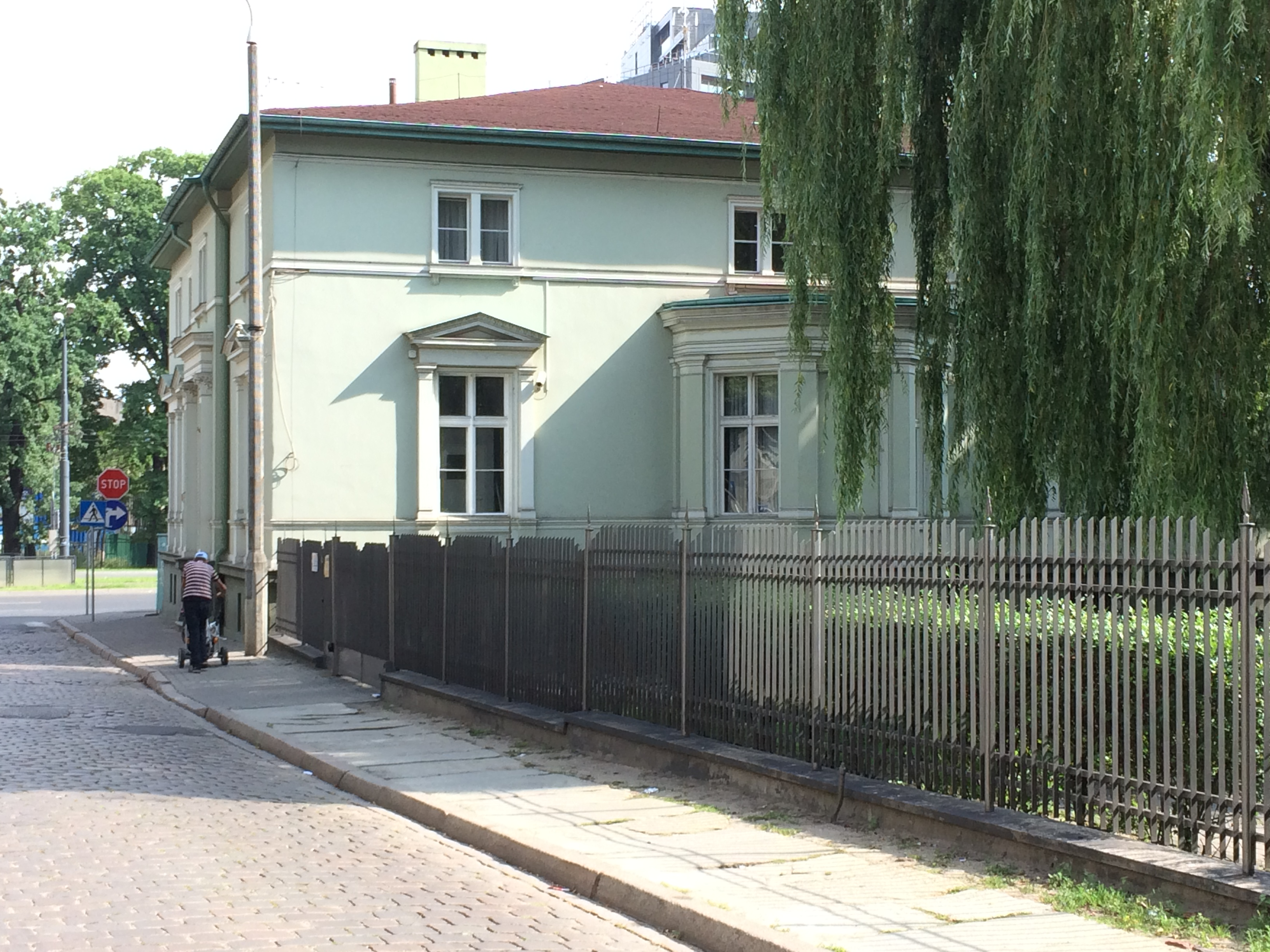
Partial view of the garden

=== House at 25 Focha street, corner with Czartoryskiego street ===
1799

Neoclassical architecture

The villa has been, from 1836 to 1920, the official residence of the presidents of the Bydgoszcz Regency (German: Regierungsbezirk,Polish: Rejencja), as the northern of two Prussian administrative regions of the Grand Duchy of Posen (1815–49) and the Province of Posen (1849–1918). The president executive office was located in today's Regional Office Building. The first president to occupy the site was Carl von Wissmann. In front of the house ran the Old Bydgoszcz Canal till 1973: opposite the villa was located one of the lock (Polish: Śluza II "Grottgera") at the level of Artur Grottger street. During the evacuation of the city by Prussians in summer 1919, furniture and equipment of the palace was spirited away.

The vast edifice has only one storey. Its elevation on Focha street displays a perfect symmetry with two annexes with vehicle gate on both side. The main entry features typical neo-classical elements: the gate is flanked by two columns, topped by a large lintel. The ensemble is part of an avant-corps crowned by a temple-like triangular pediment.

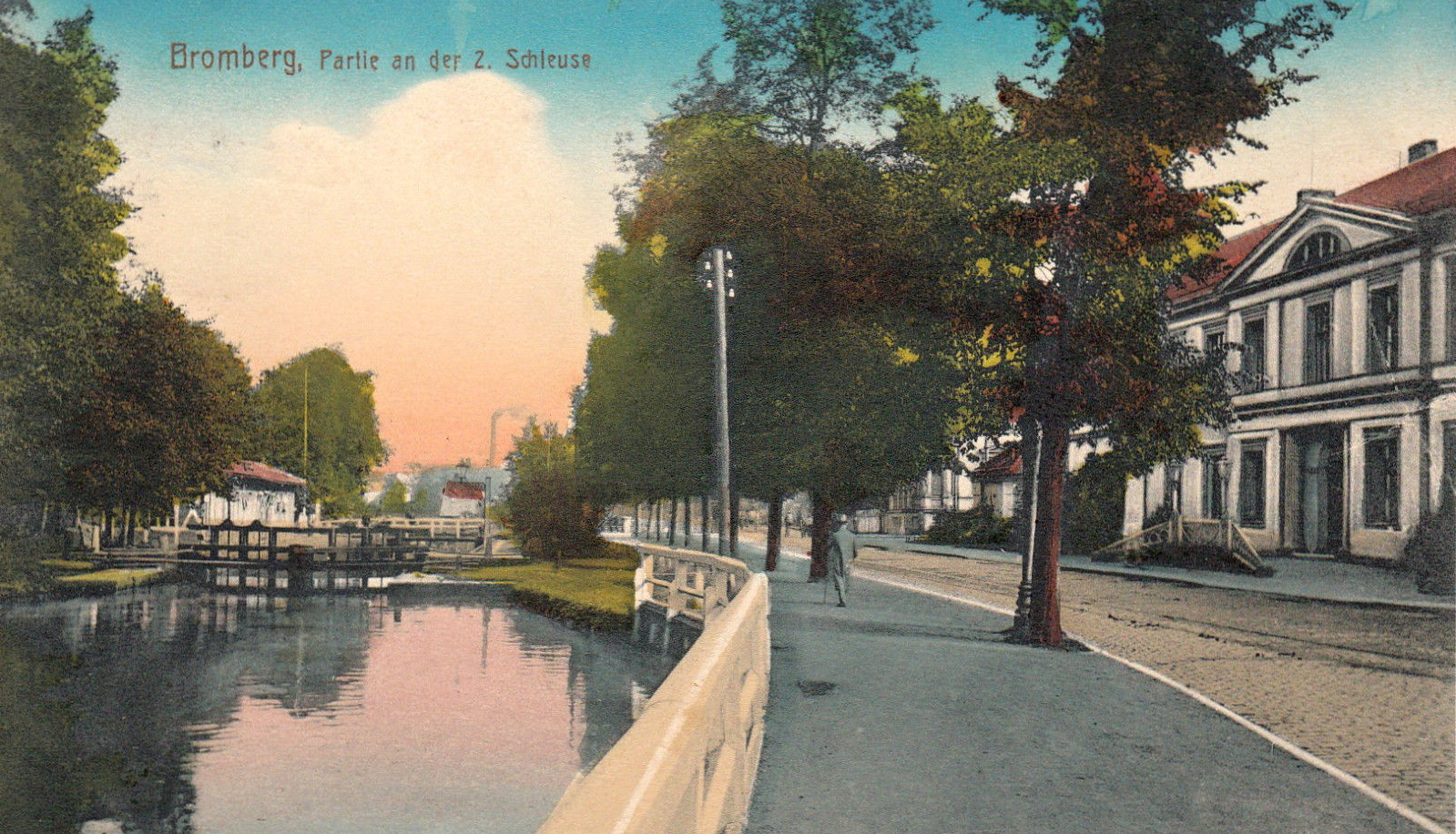
Villa at Nr.25 in 1914, in front of the Old canal lock

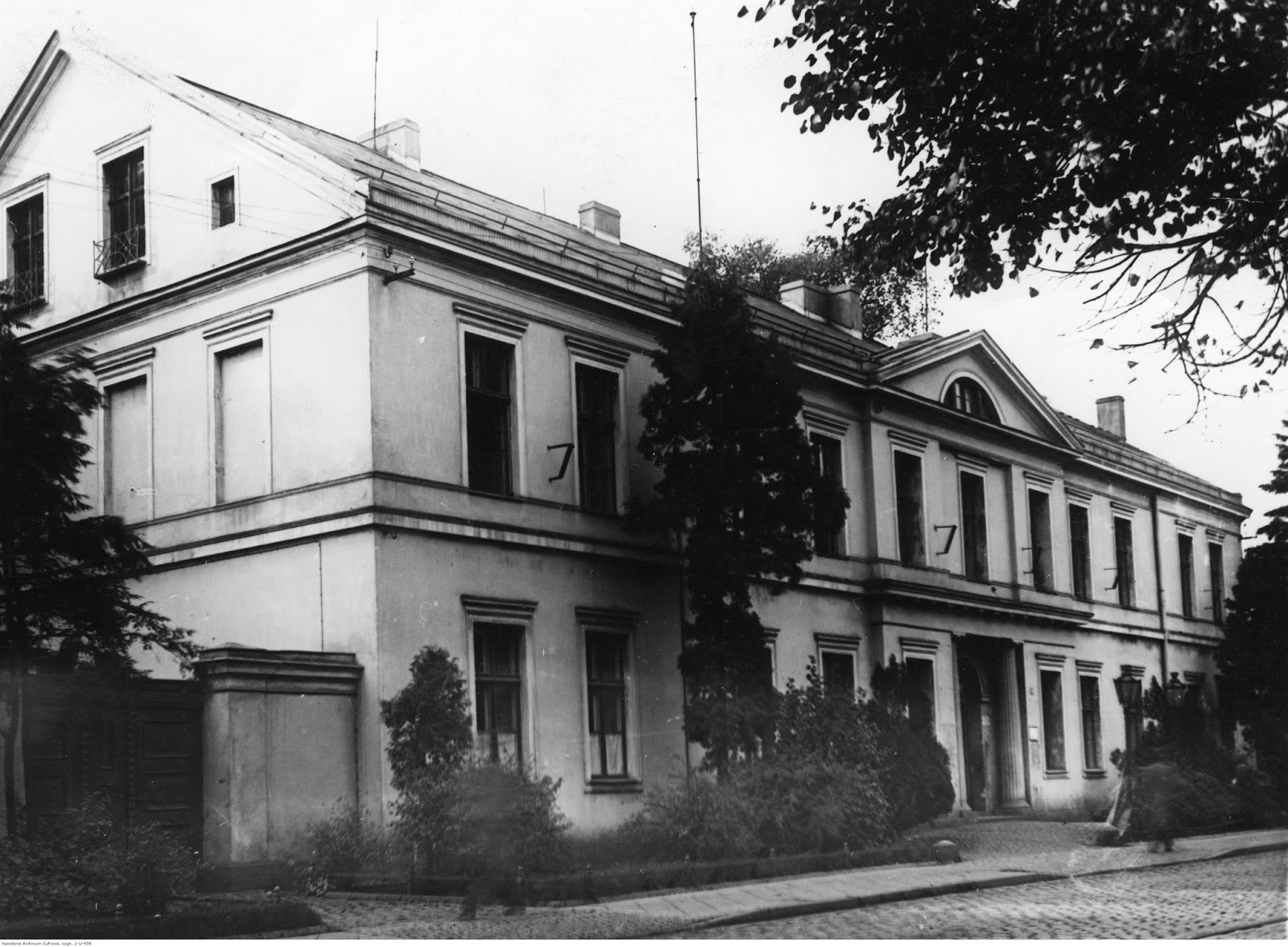
Picture of Regency building ca 1900s

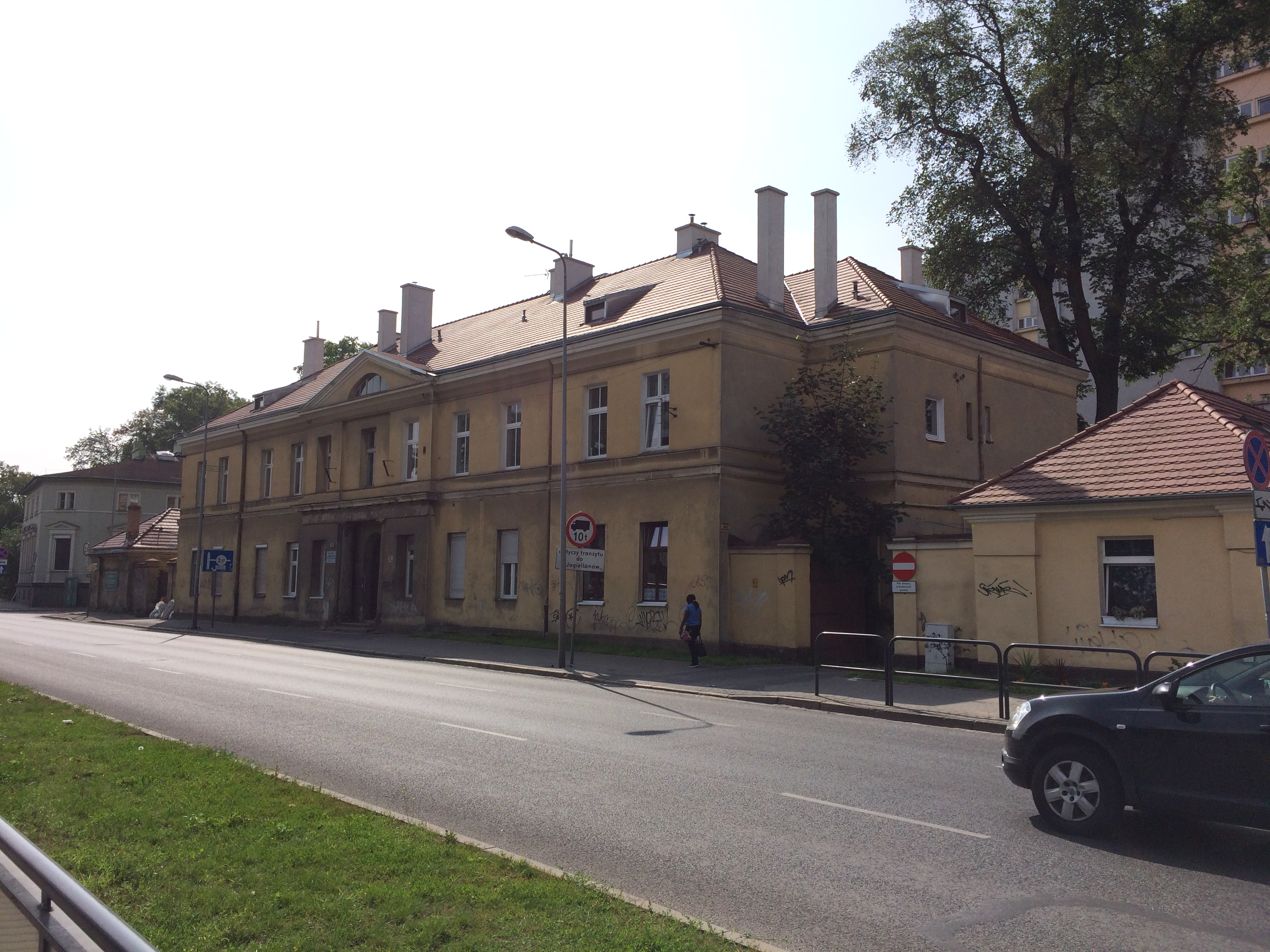
View from the street

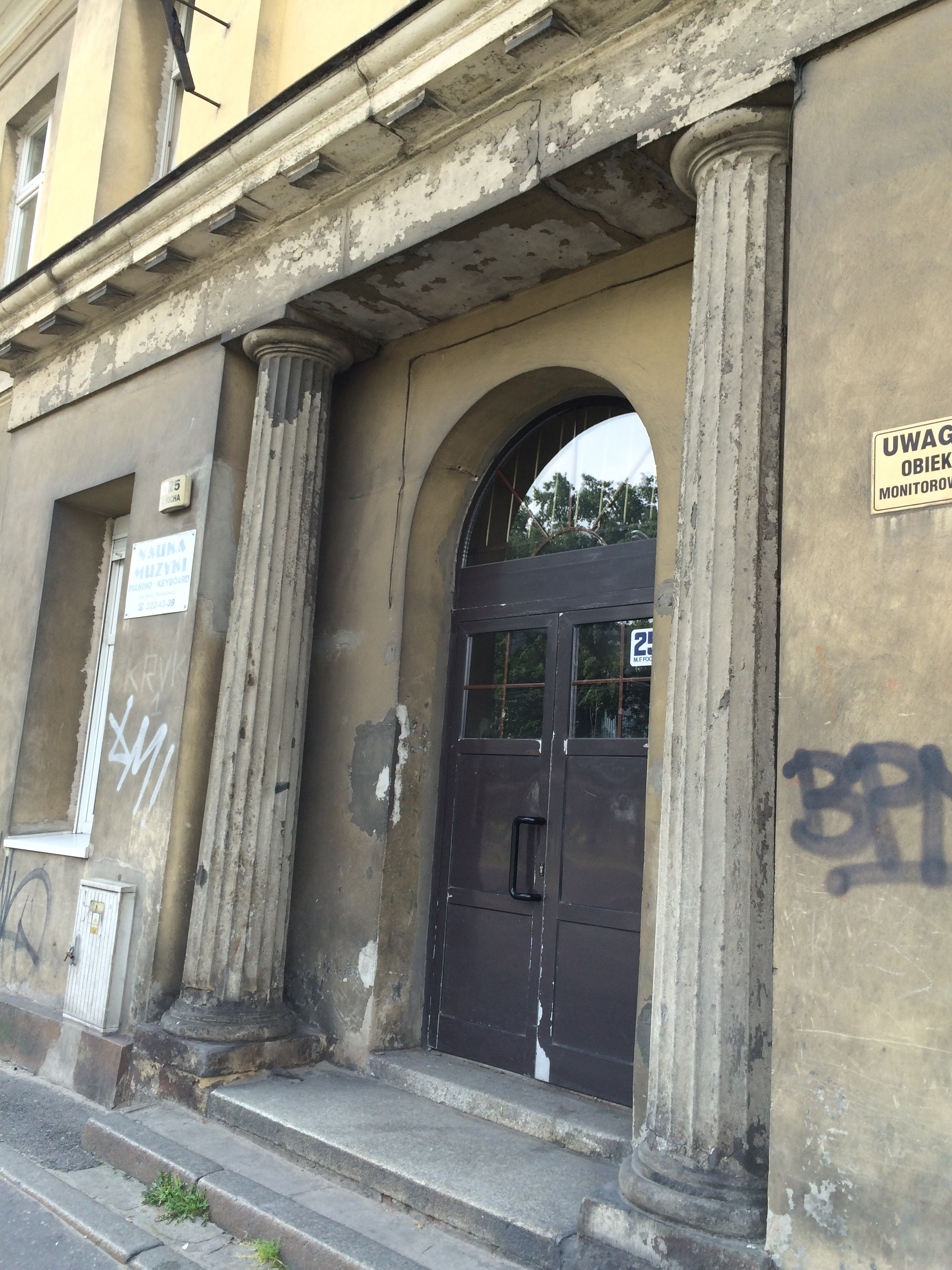
Main gate

== See also ==
- Bydgoszcz
- Franke family (Bydgoszcz)
- Mill Island, Bydgoszcz
- Focha street

== Bibliography ==
- Umiński, Janusz (1996). Bydgoszcz. Przewodnik (in Polish). Bydgoszcz: Regionalny Oddział PTTK "Szlak Brdy".
