= Świętej Trójcy Street, Bydgoszcz =

Street in Bydgoszcz, Poland

Coordinates: 53°07′26″N 17°59′30″E

Świętej Trójcy street in Bydgoszcz
Bydgoszcz
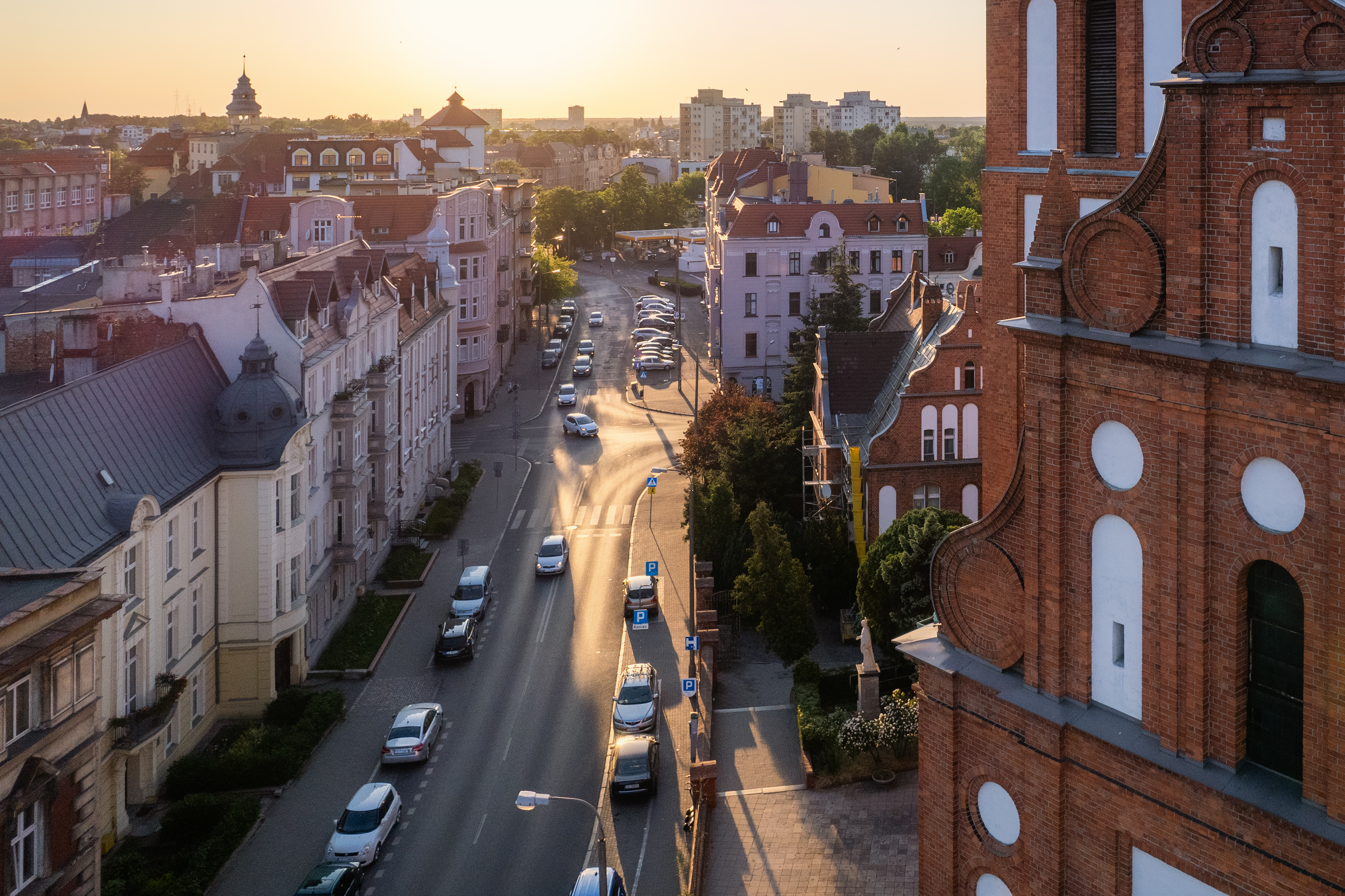
- Bird's-eye view

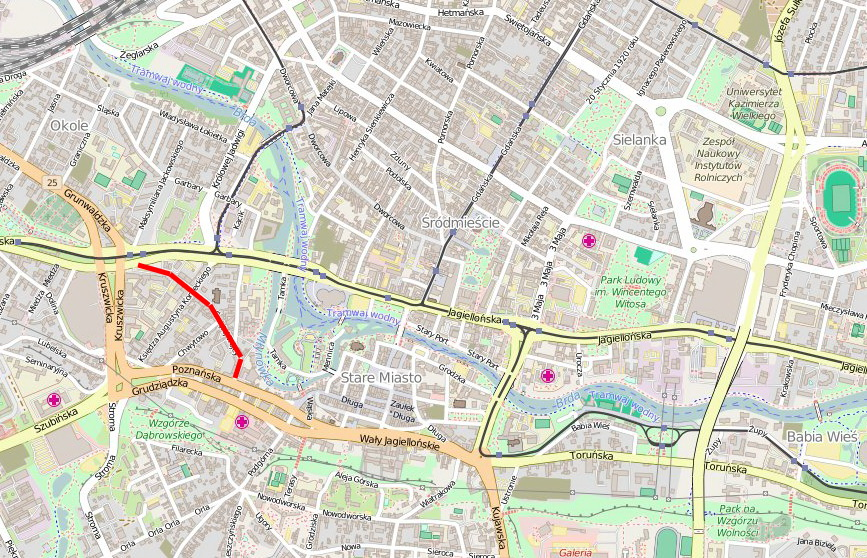
- Location of Swiętej Trojcy street
- Native name: Ulica Świętej Trójcy (Polish)
- Former names: Berliner Straße, Potsdamer Straße
- Namesake: Holy Trinity
- Owner: City of Bydgoszcz
- Length: 700 m (2,300 ft); Google maps
- Location: Bydgoszcz, Poland

Construction
- Completed: 1850s

Świętej Trójcy street is a historical street of downtown Bydgoszcz, Poland, bearing several buildings registered on the Kuyavian-Pomeranian Voivodeship Heritage List.

== Location ==
Świętej Trójcy street follows a quarter of a circle arc, with one tip facing south and the other facing west. It connects Poznańska street to Kruszwicka street and brushes through the area of Mill Island (Polish: Wyspa Młyńska), crossing Kordeckiego street.

== History ==
Located very close to the old town and its walls, the street is mentioned in early documents from the 1850s. It then developed to actual arc shape, linking at the time Pozener Straße (Poznańska street) to Canal Straße (today's Nakielska street). At that point, the path crossed the Bydgoszcz Canal and extended westward, as Berliner Chaussee (today's Grunwaldzka street).

At the turn of the 20th century, an establishment of leisure with a concert hall called Patzer Etablissement set up nearby the canal, in a green environment.

In 1913, the Church of the Holy Trinity in Bydgoszcz, located at then Nr.24 (today Nr.26) has been inaugurated.

A tram line has run in Świętej Trojcy street from March 1898 to September 1970.

Through history, the street bore the following names:

- 1870s-1920, Berliner Straße;
- 1920–1939, Ulica Świętej Trojcy;
- 1939–1945, Potsdamer Straße;
- Since 1945, Ulica Świętej Trojcy (Świętej Trojcy Street).

The current namesake refers to Holy Trinity, hence the patron of the only church in the street.

== Main edifices ==
=== Tenement at 1, corner with Poznańka street ===
Early 1850s & 1980s

Modern architecture

The earliest address book mentioned in 1855 the landlord of then Posener Straße 337E (later Nr.26) to be Mr Cords, then his widow Bertha in 1864. In the late 1880s, property moved to a merchant and to a vet doctor. In 1910, the new owner, a carpenter, had the house rebuilt: his name was August Kneiding, living at Korn Markt 9, today's Długa street 65. His family possessed it and later lived there till the outbreak of World War II. During the war, a restaurant, the Gaststätte Wendel was located there.

The old Kneiding's house was torn down in the 1980s so the current modern building could be erected.

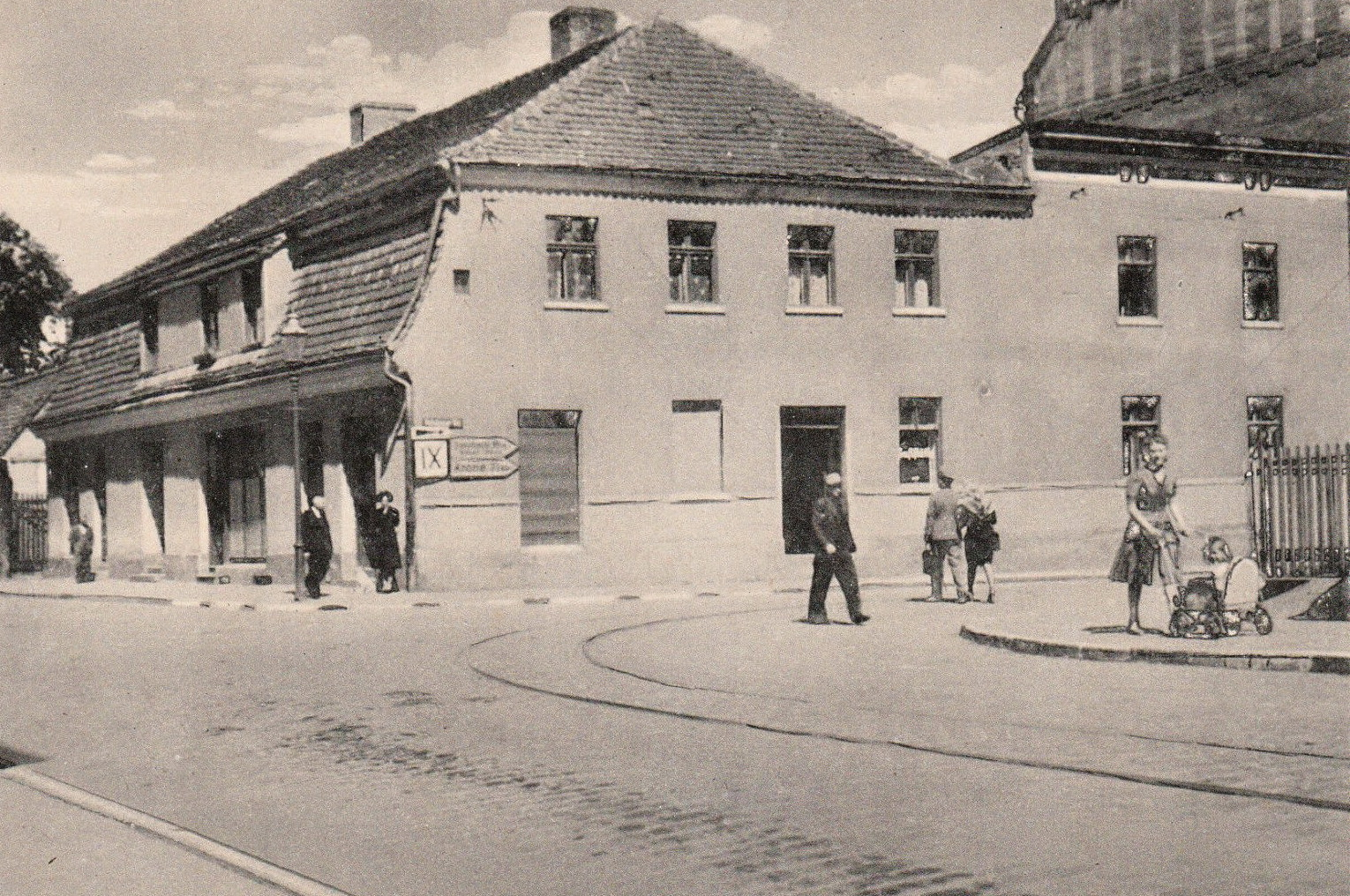
Kneiding's house with restaurant Wendel, ca 1940

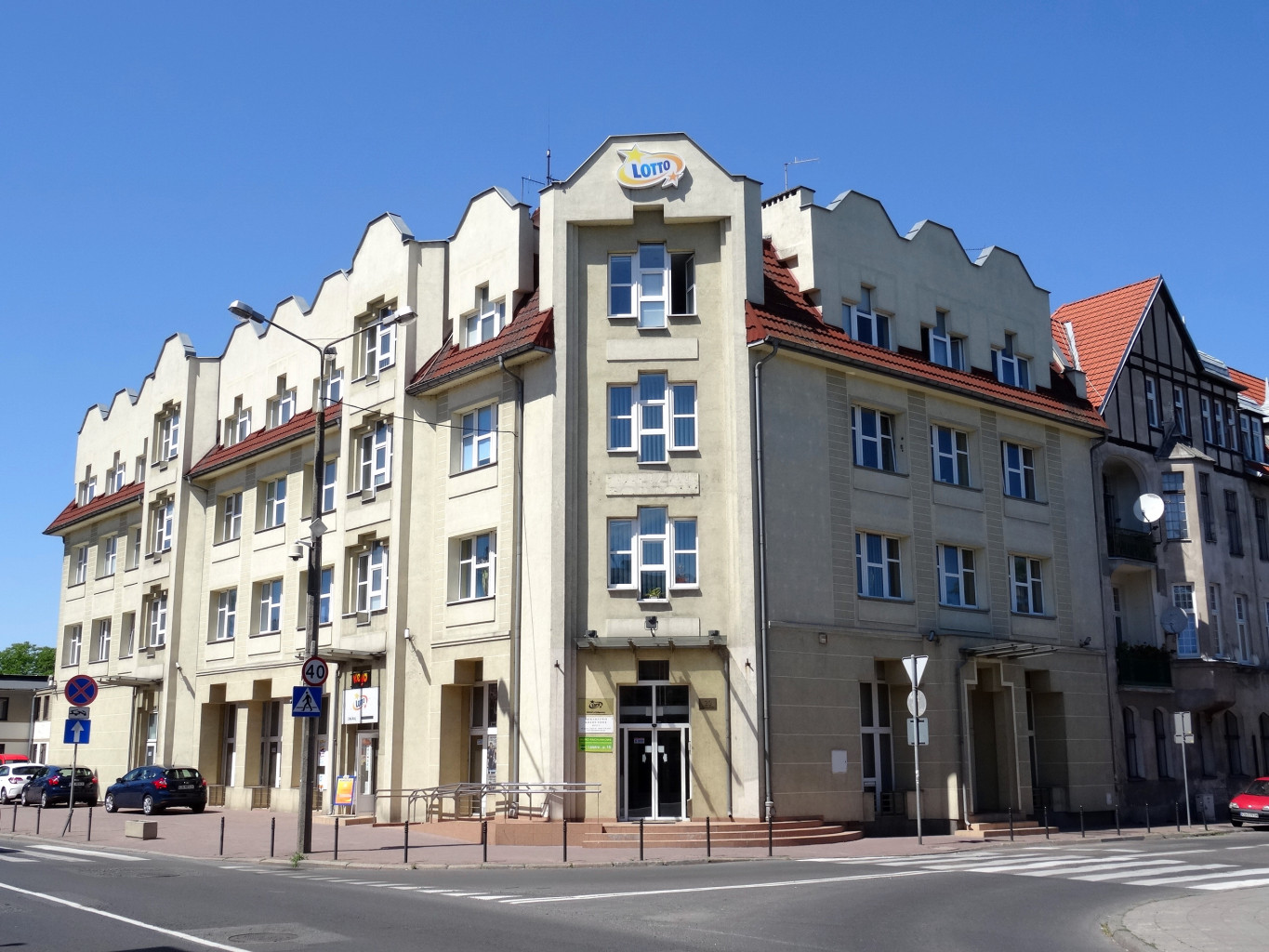
Current building at the corner of Świętej Trojcy

=== Factory building at 2 ===
Early 1950s

Modern architecture

The plot was initially one of the production site of the confectionery firm Jutrzenka. The edifice has been housing the firm "Modus", one of the largest companies in the country, specialized in sewing official and military clothing. The company was founded in 1945 as a state-owned Zakłady Przemysłu Urządzowego "Modus" (English: Equipment Industry Plants) in Bydgoszcz. The plant had 12 branches, scattered in downtown old buildings. In the time of the Polish People's Republic, the quality of products was not always high, but buyers were easily found. In 1992, in the realities of the market economy, the company was divided into four independent entities:

- "Modus" Clothing Company in Bydgoszcz;
- "Modina" Clothing Company in Inowrocław;
- "Mikon" Clothing Company in Miłosław;
- "Piła" Clothing Industry in Piła.

On August 1, 1994, the company in Bydgoszcz was transformed into a Joint-stock company and by 2000, the company was restructured by selling redundant real estate, reducing employment. Eventually, in 2005, "Modus" focused on the production and sale of uniforms for the police, the military, fire departments and other services. "Modus" was awarded the 2016 the Forbes Diamond title: it ranked 27th in Kuyavian-Pomeranian Voivodeship with a 41% increase of its value between 2012 and 2014.

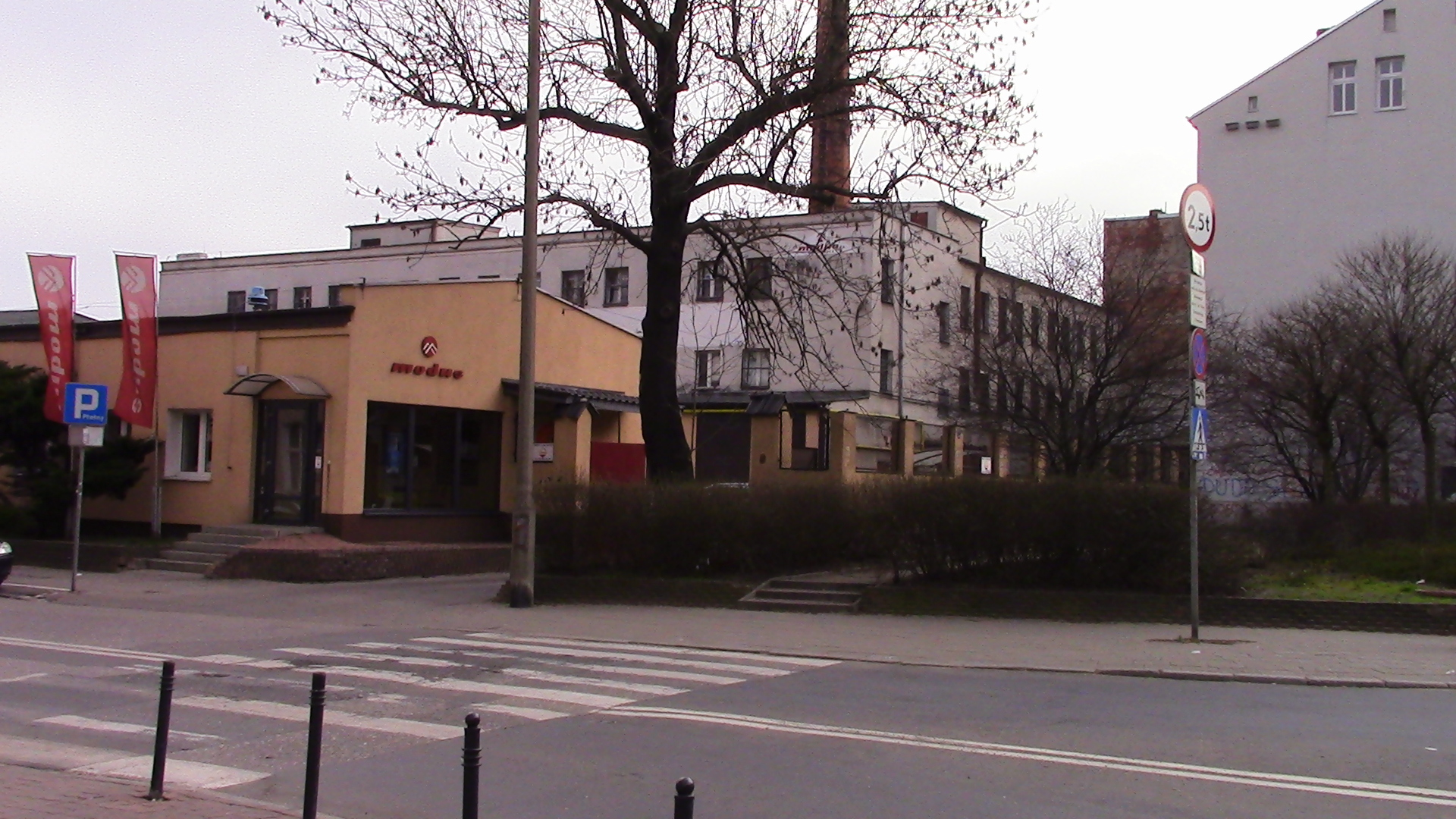
Current building at the corner of Świętej Trojcy

=== Tenement at 3 ===
1910

German Historicism

In the 1850s the area of Berliner Straße 2 and its surroundings was occupied by an iron foundry factory established in 1846 by Friedrich Eberhardt in Jakob Straße (today Grudziądzka Street). In 1904, a piece of the whole plot was built for Agnes Wiechert the wife of a veterinary surgeon, as Nr.1a. On March 1, 1923, the building housed the seat of the nascent company Eltra established by Stefan Ciszewski, an engineer from Warsaw. In 1992, a wall plaque was unveiled near the porch, to commemorate World War II clandestine armed groups that fought in 1942–1945. Codenamed "3x3", the cell was led by Lieutenant Colonel and intelligence officer Józef Gruss. Józef Chyliński was arrested by communist security organs in 1945, and after two years spent in prison, he moved to Canada, where he died in 1985. Józef Gruss was captured by the Gestapo but escaped in January 1945. Arrested after the war by the secret police, he was sentenced to 10 years in prison for conspiracy activities in the Armed Forces. After his release, he lived in this tenement until his death in 1969. In late December 2017, a fire broke out in the attic, destroying most of the wattle and daub gabbles.

The building is an example of German historicism, with a mix of early Art Nouveau elements (curved shapes, round bay windows, floral wrought iron motifs on the balconies) and more ancient styles (Wattle and daub building, tented roof with peak). The most recent renovation (September 2016) restored the gate portal and its transom light.

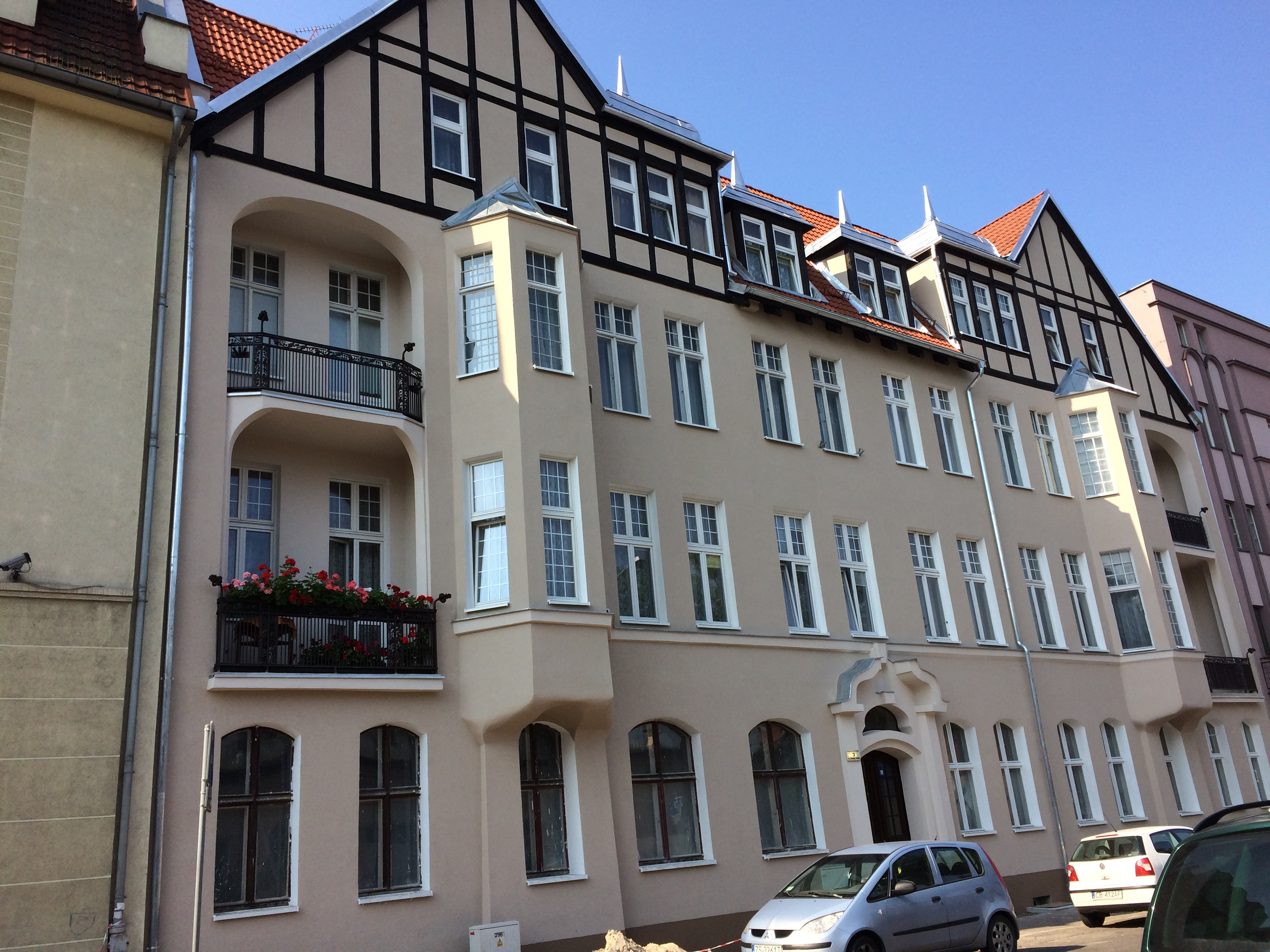
Main elevation

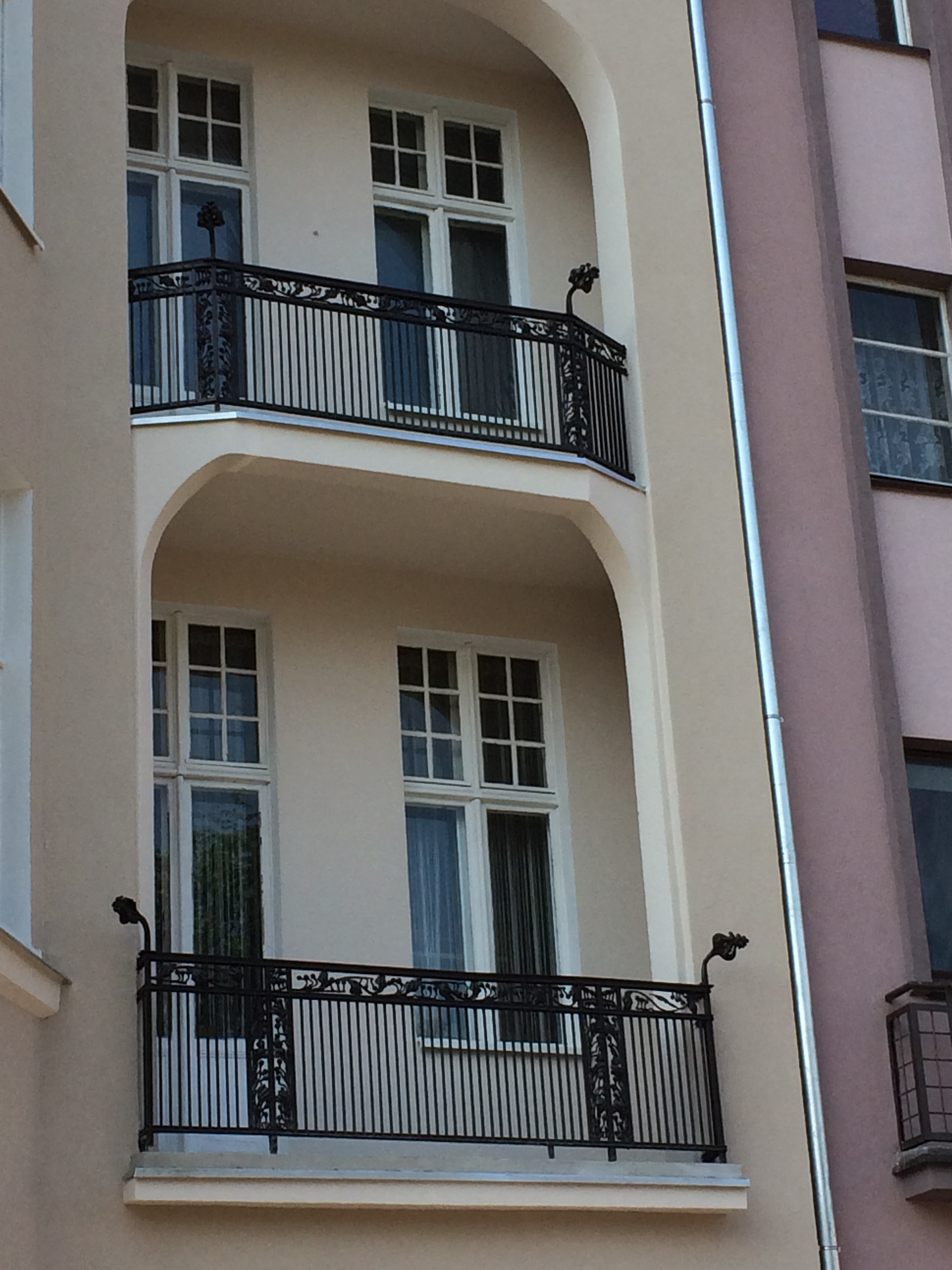
Wrought iron balconies

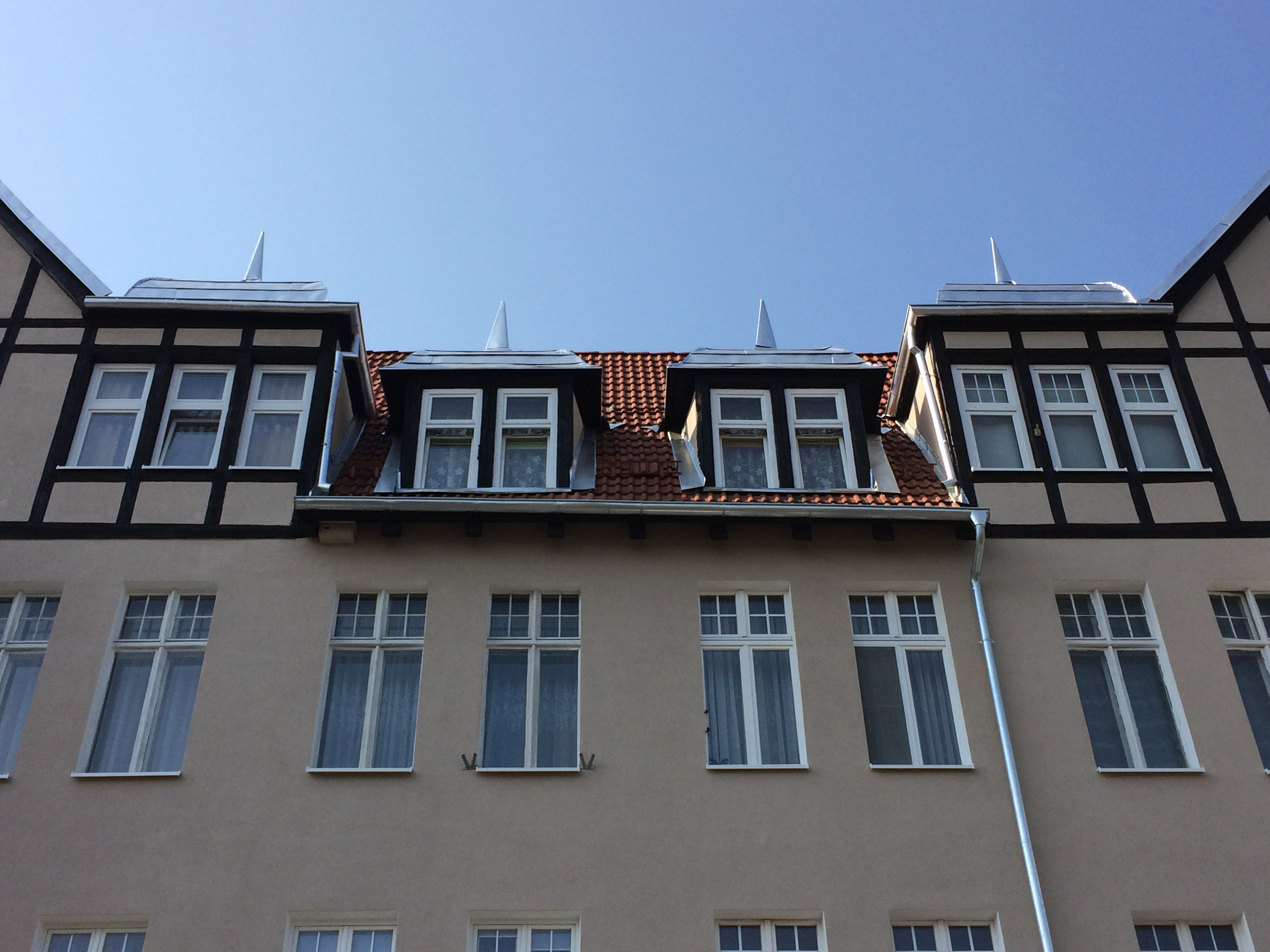
Gable and dormers

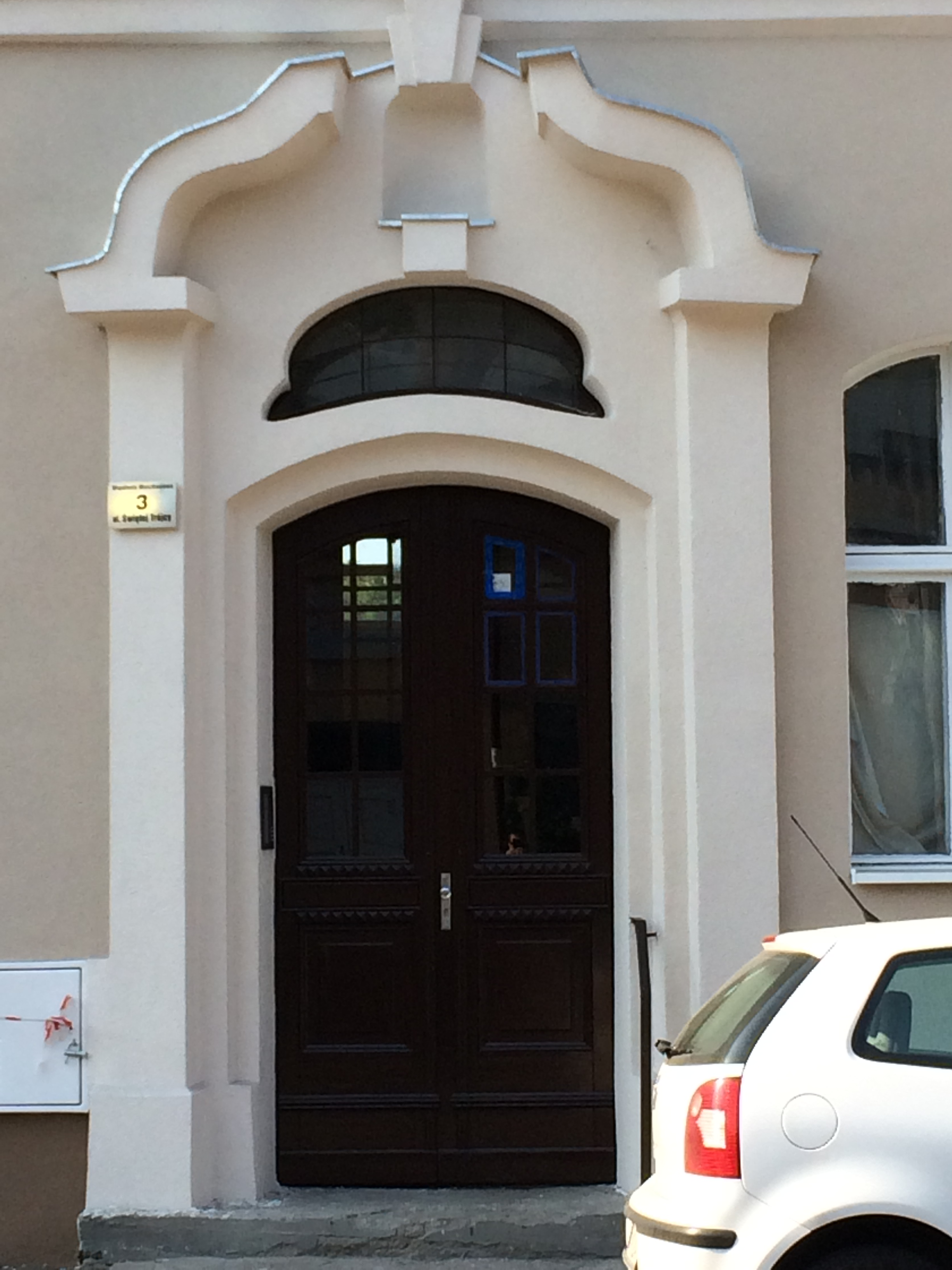
Main gate porch

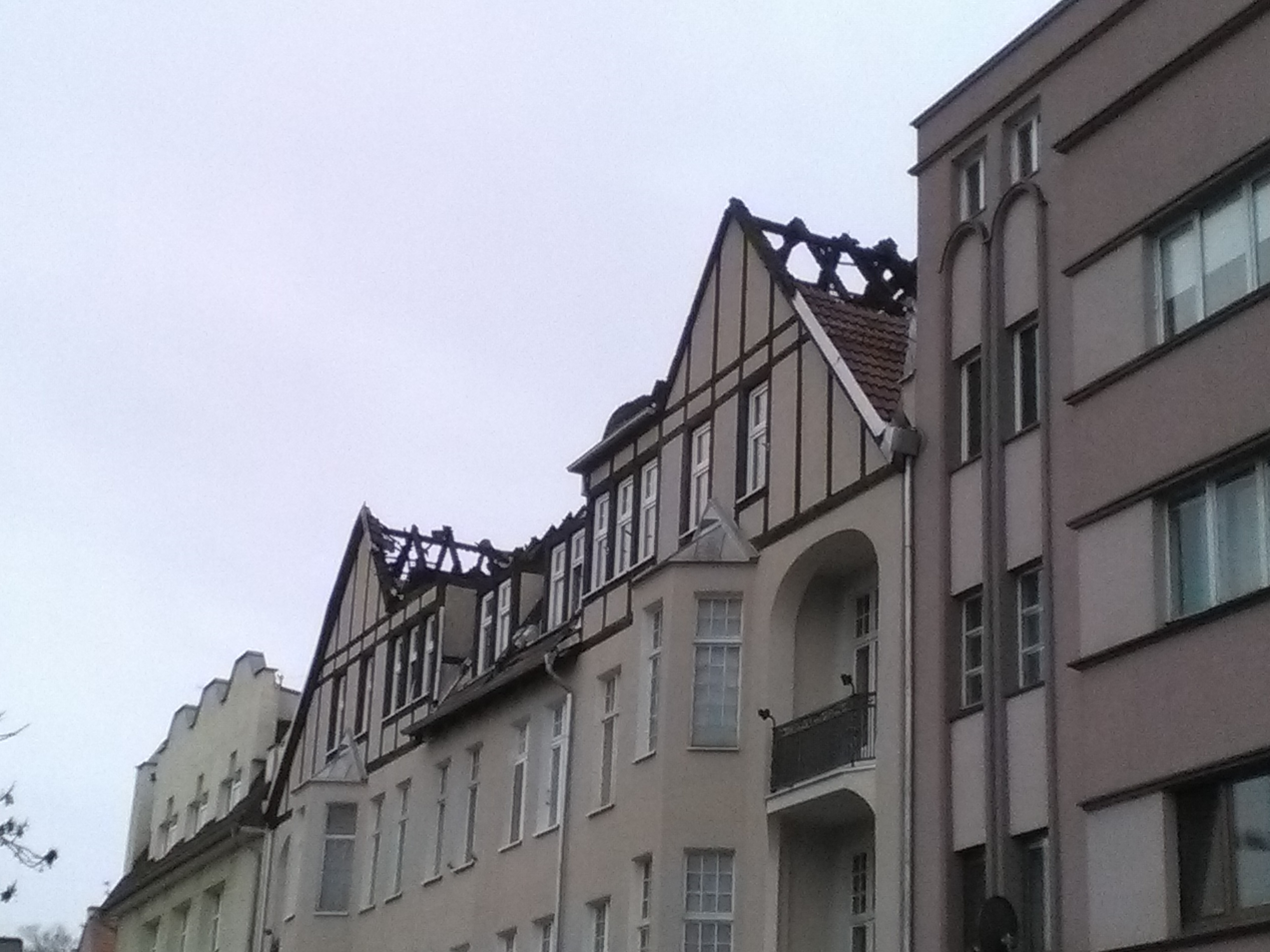
View of the gabbles after the fire

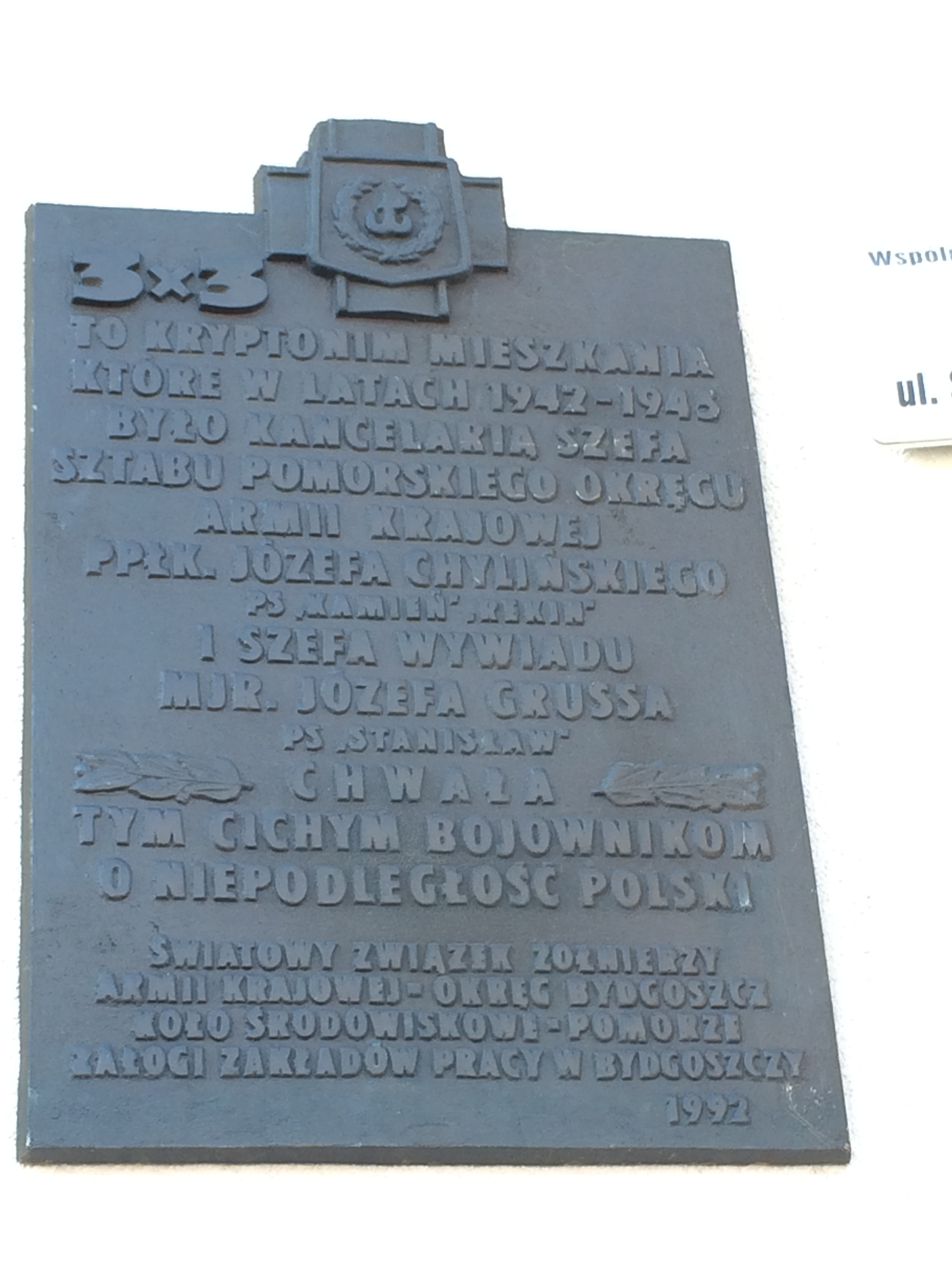
Wall plaque

=== Wilhelm Kopp's dye house, at Nr.4/6 ===
1903

Industrial architecture

The first dye house owned by Bydgoszcz industrialist William Kopp was established in 1878 in a nearby street. The company employed just two workers. In 1883, the owner significantly expanded its activity by purchasing a facility in Poznańska street. In 1893, the plant accidentally burned down, due to the misuse of gasoline, which was then used as a cleaning agent.

After 10 years using a temporary place downtown, Wilhelm Kopp had to build a new plant in 1903, on Świętej Trójcy Street, then Berliner straße 33. Clothes were coming from several regional office branches to be washed in special washing machines, using gasoline as a detergent that could remove coffee, tea, beer and wine stains. After washing and drying, clothes were ironed and packed. The plant experienced a period of prosperity at the beginning of the 20th century, setting up service points in the city (11 Gdańska street, 12 Mostowa street or 2 Wełniany square) but also in several other cities (Toruń, Inowrocław, Gniezno, Gdańsk, Olsztyn and Chełmno. From 1904 to 1910, the company grew from 32 workers, of whom 26 were women, up to 60 people.

When William Kopp died in 1919, company ownership moved to his two daughters and six sons. In practice, only three sons (Rudolf Wilhelm Albert, Julius Otto Friedrich and Felix Ernst Max) ran the business. The plant successfully operated, under Kopp Family management, through the interwar period and past the German occupation period. After World War II, the factory was nationalized and taken over by state company "Pralchem" but eventually ceased business in the 1990s.

In 2006, the question of rebuilding the dye house into luxury apartments has been raised: such a project would have created around 30 loft houses, an indoor swimming pool and a winter garden overlooking Mill Island, with a 300 m^{2} service center on the ground floor. However, the plan has never been realized. In 2011, a new owner suggested another project for a 126 rooms hotel with a restaurant, a conference room, a wellness center and a winter garden on the roof to be completed by the end of 2013. This project is currently on hold.

The building has five storeys and an ancillary section. It was constructed in bricks, following the industrial architecture characteristic of the late 19th century. At the lower level were placed dye machinery and steam engine boilers. The upper floors housed laundry facilities, gasoline sewage, ironing area, expedition and housing.

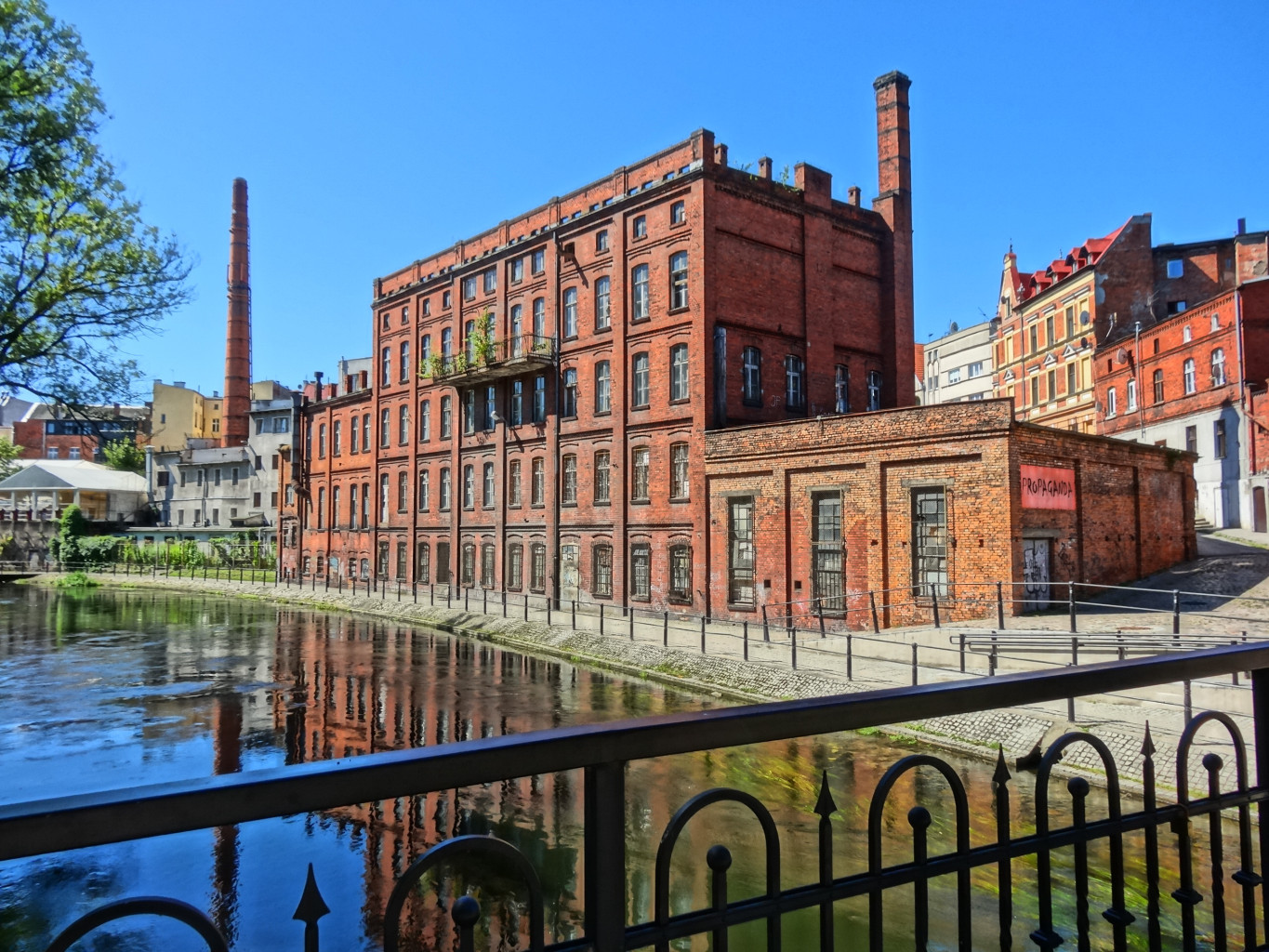
The old dye building

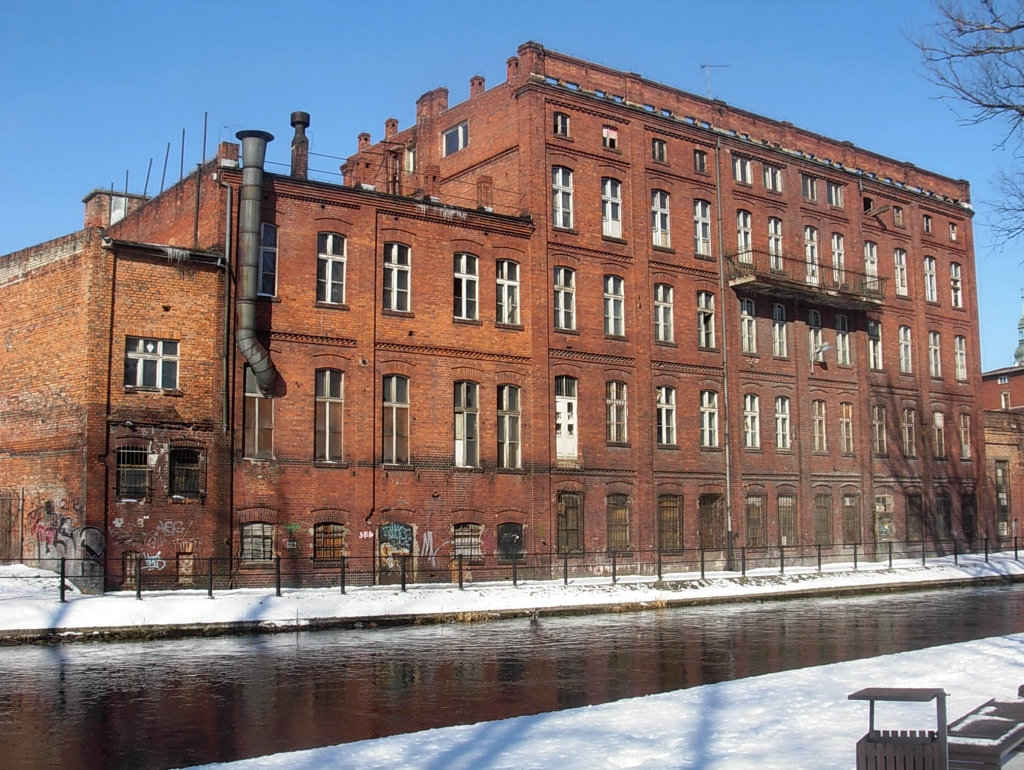
The old dye building

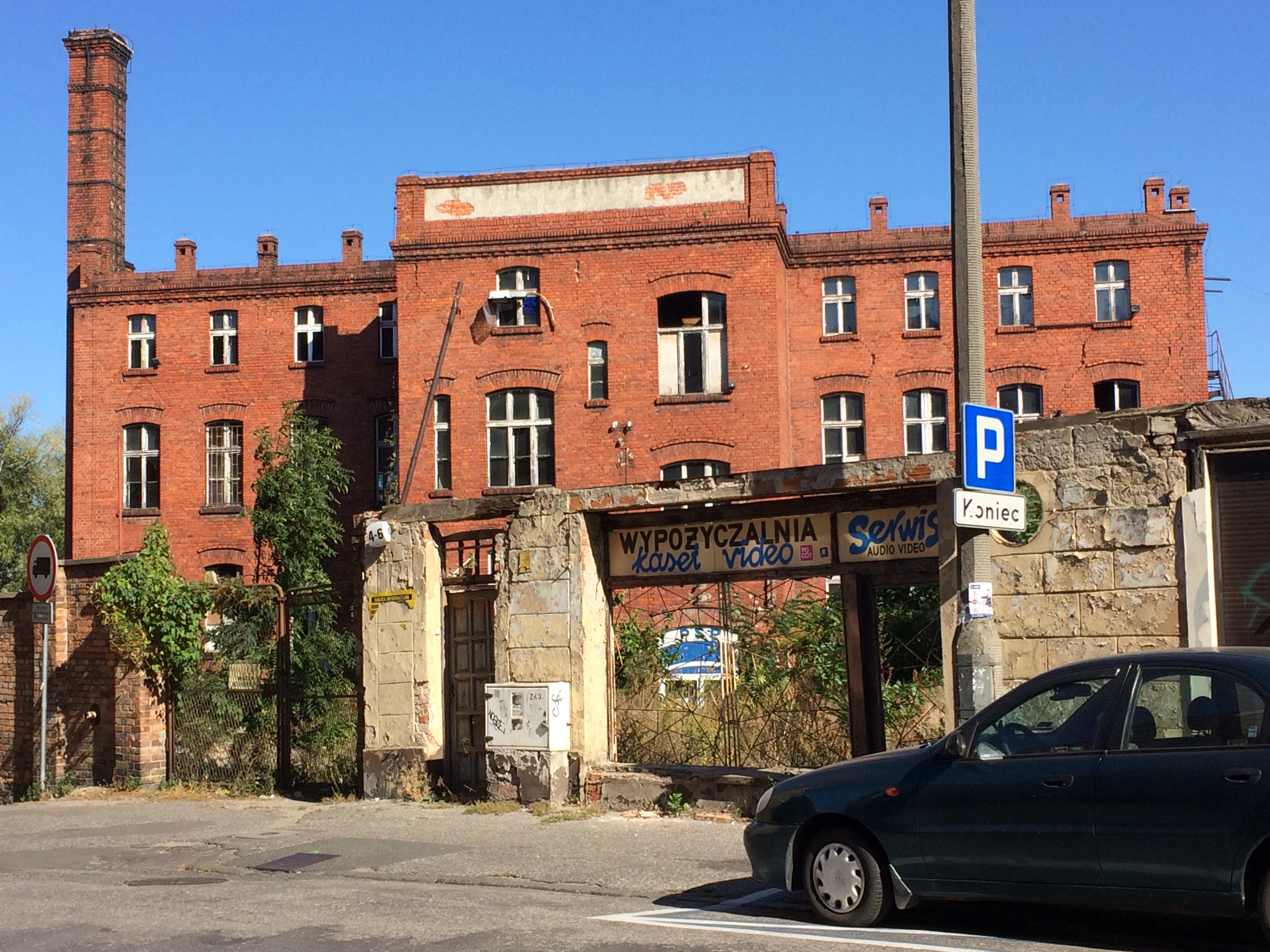
View from the street

=== Tenements at Nr.5,5A,7,9,11 ===
1885

Modern architecture

The area of Berliner straße 2 and its surroundings was in the 1850s occupied by an iron foundry factory established in 1846 by Friedrich Eberhardt in Jakob Straße (today Grudziądzka Street). In particular, it produced in 1857 the steam machine of nearby August Franke's spirit refinery located on Mill Island. After Friedrich, his son Richard, then his wife Amelie took over the lead of the company. In 1900, a sibling, Fritz Eberhardt, was in command of F. Eberhardt company.

Buildings at Nr.5/5A have been designed in the 1930s by Jan Kossowski. In Bydgoszcz, this architect also realized, among others, the Freedom Monument and houses at 5 Ossoliński Alley and 7 Plac Wolności.

The factory worked until the end of World War II. After the war, the plant was nationalized in 1960. It closed eventually in 1994 and was torn down in 2002–2003. Today, a few brick buildings still recall the industrial past, lost among Modern architecture edifices.

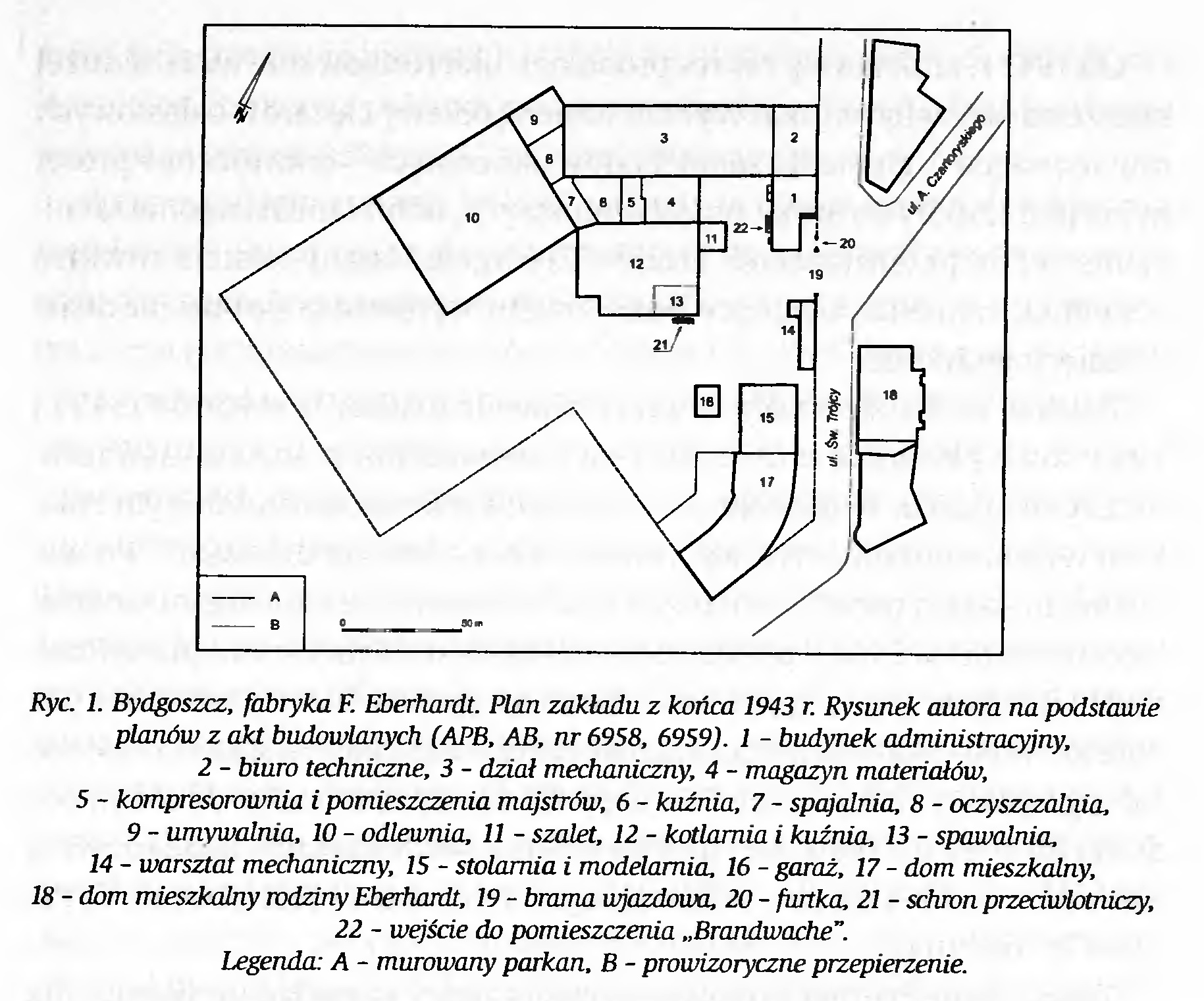
Map of Eberhardt factory, ca 1943

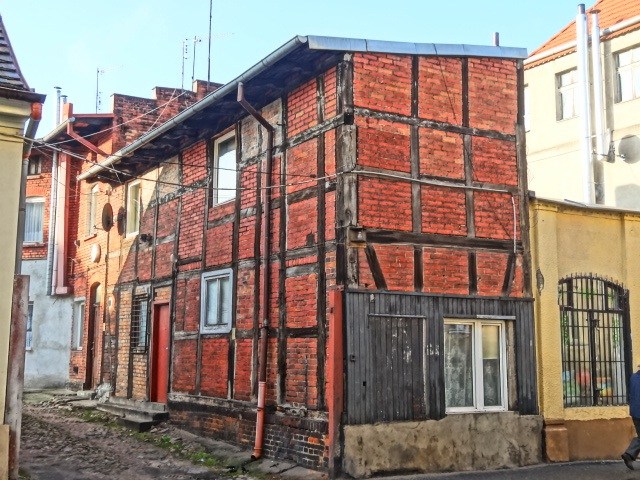
Old building factory

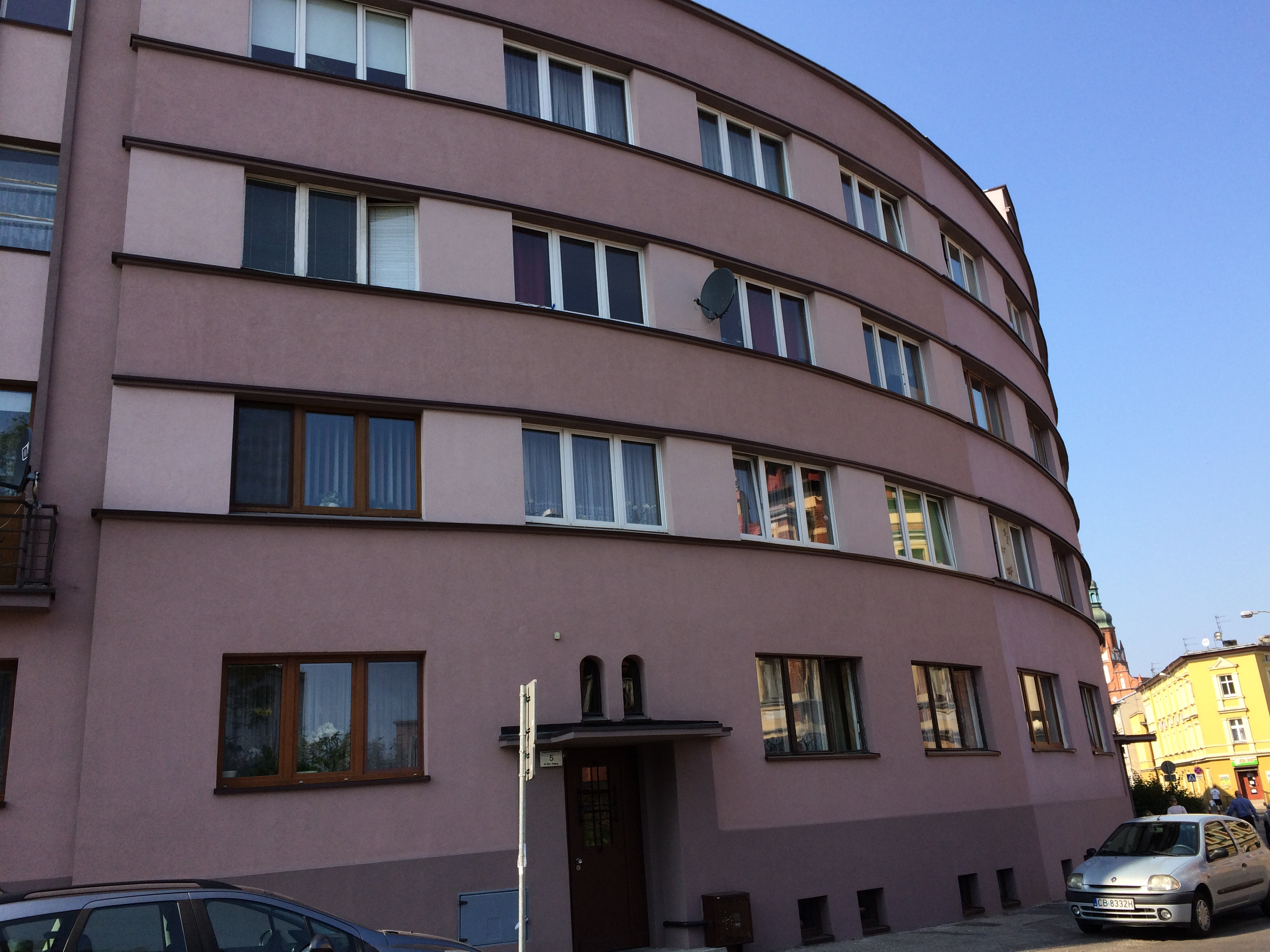
Facade at Nr.5

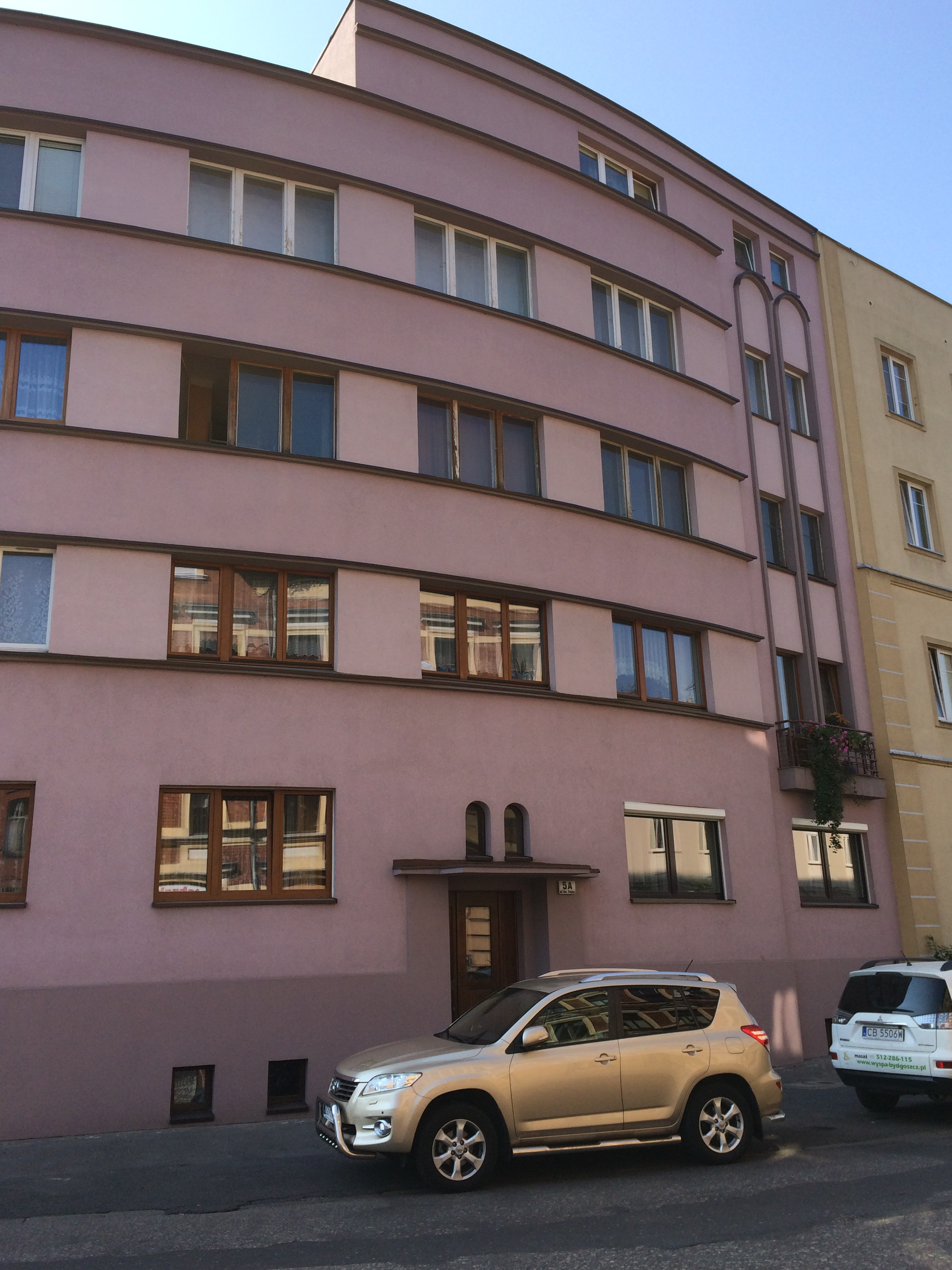
Facade at Nr.5A

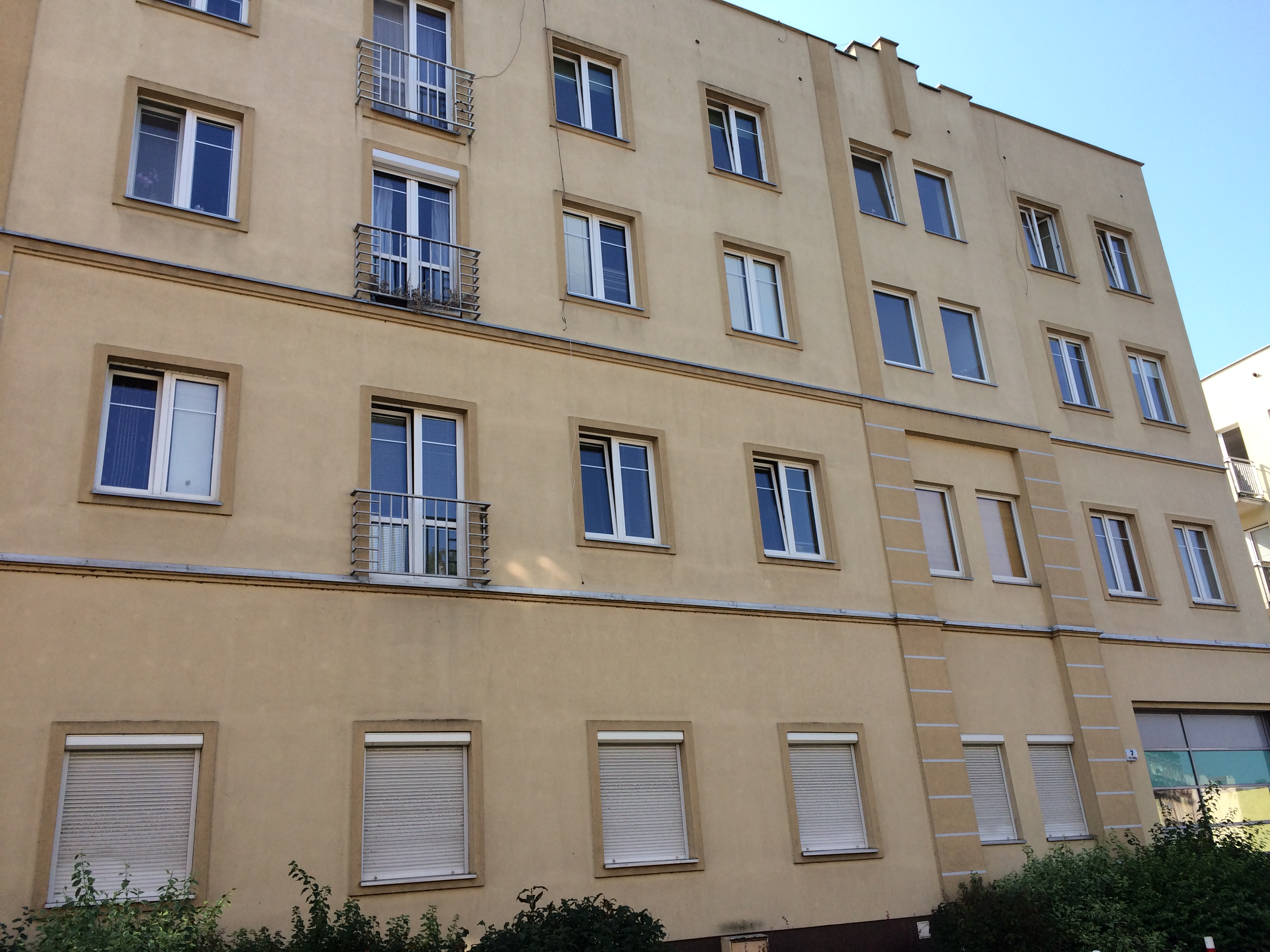
Building at Nr.7

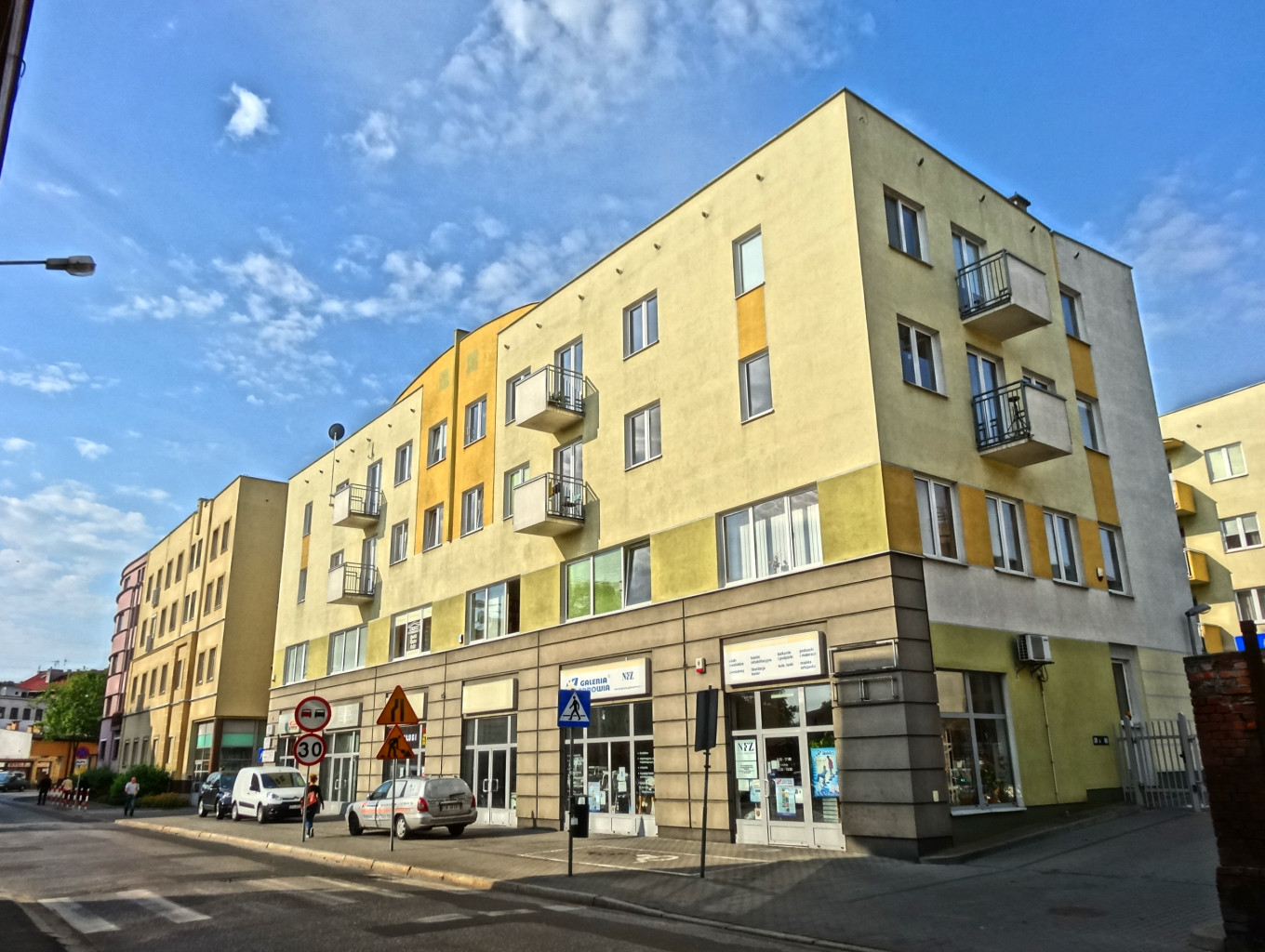
Building at Nr.11

=== Eberhardt tenement, at 8 ===
1850s

Neo-Renaissance

This town house was located initially at Berliner straße 424E then Berliner straße 31, and was ordered by Friedrich Eberhardt in the 1850s for his personal use. It was ideally situated just across the street, a few meters from his plant producing cast iron and steam powered machines. The edifice then housed successive family members who ruled F. Eberhardt's factory:

- Friedrich's son Richard and his widow Amelie in the 1890s;
- Fritz Eberhardt in 1900;
- Marie Eberhardt before World War I;
- Jan Eberhardt during interwar period.

The edifice is an example of Neo-Renaissance architecture. The three-storey building, based on a triangular footprint, displays two different brick and plaster facades, with a bay window in the corner and a Mansard roof. The house is characterised by two peaks with finials, one of which has a metal forged lira.

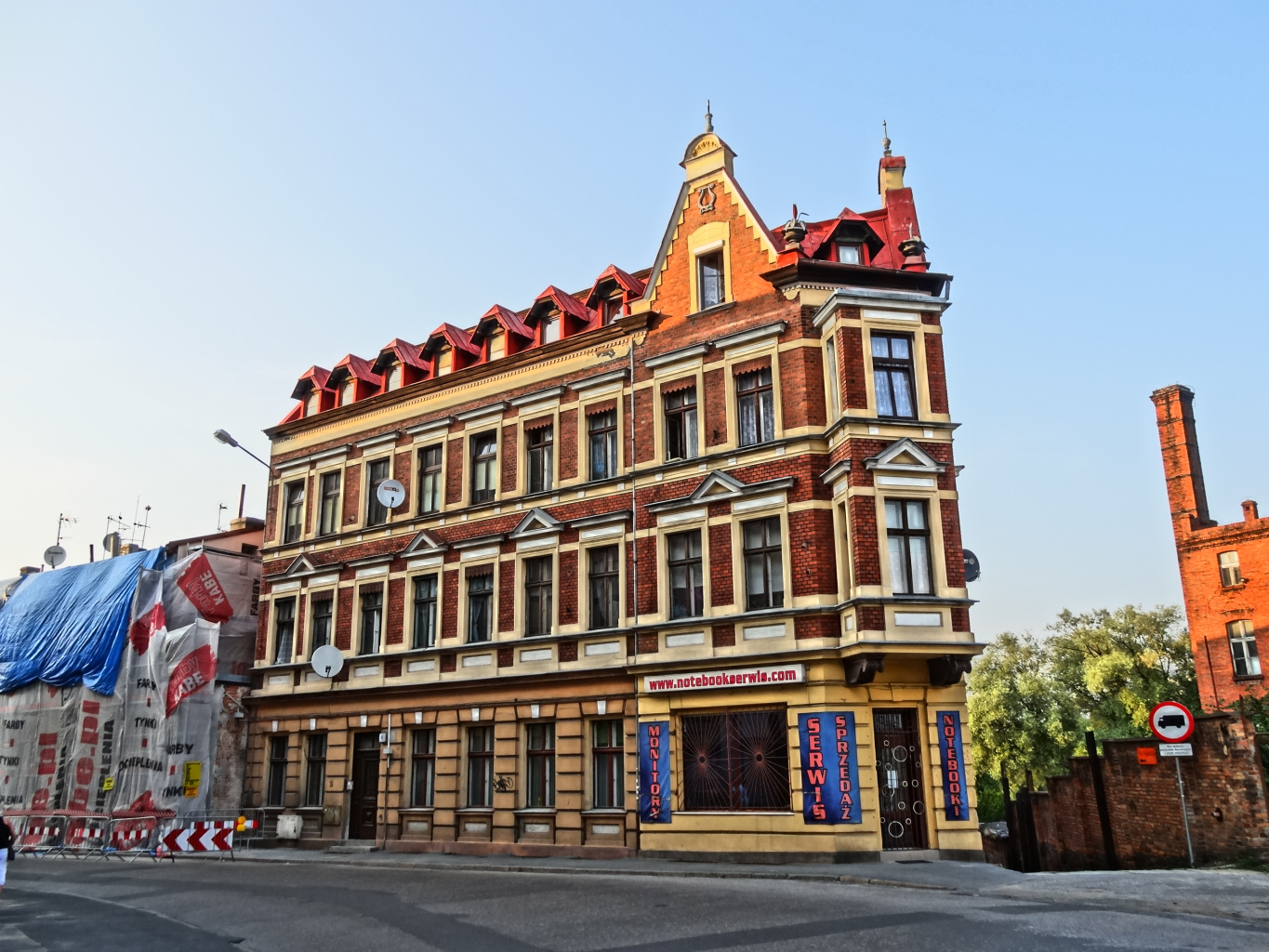
View from the street

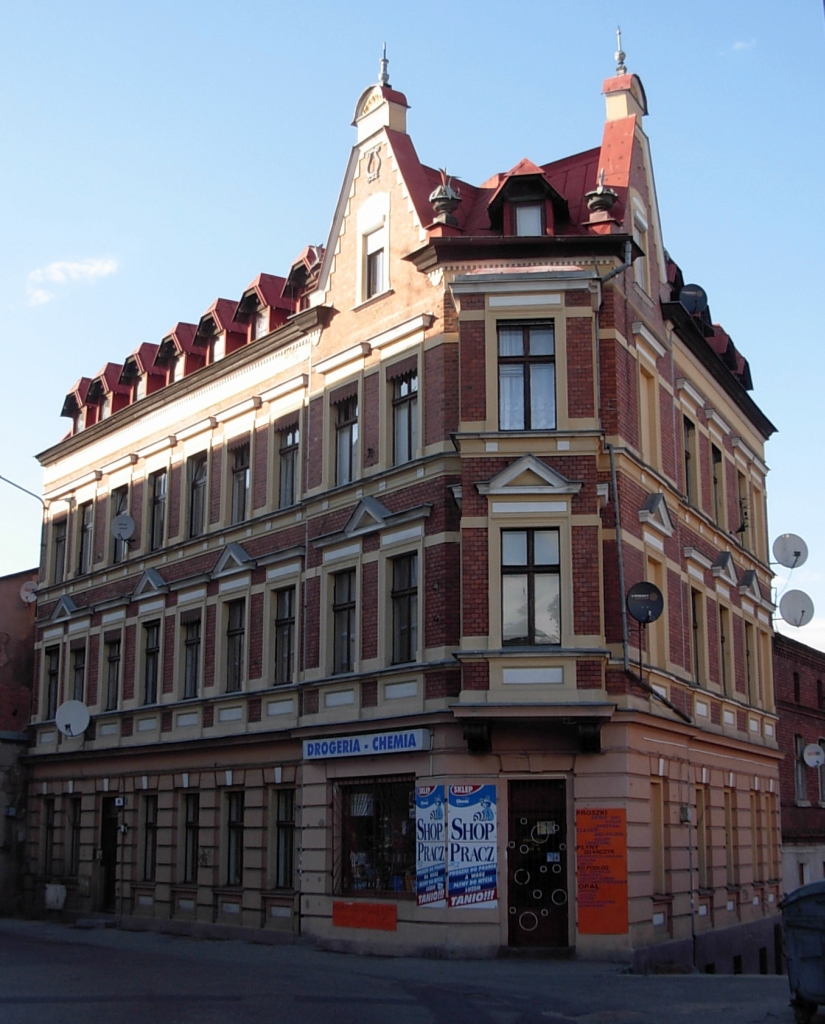
Corner view

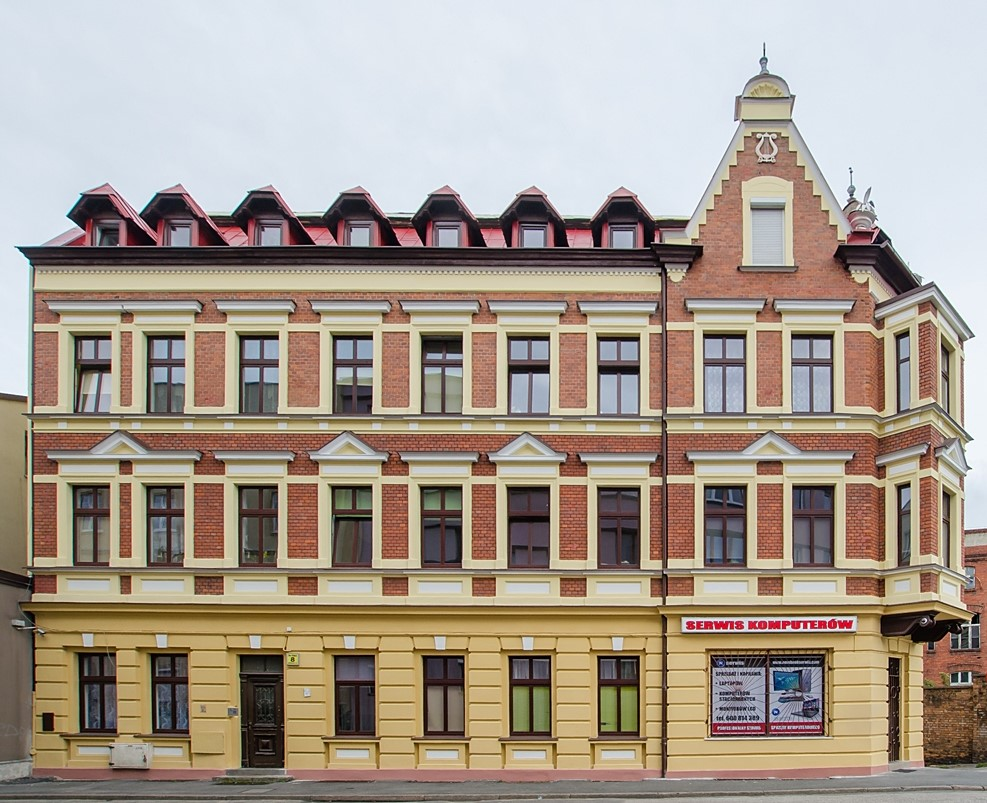
Main elevation

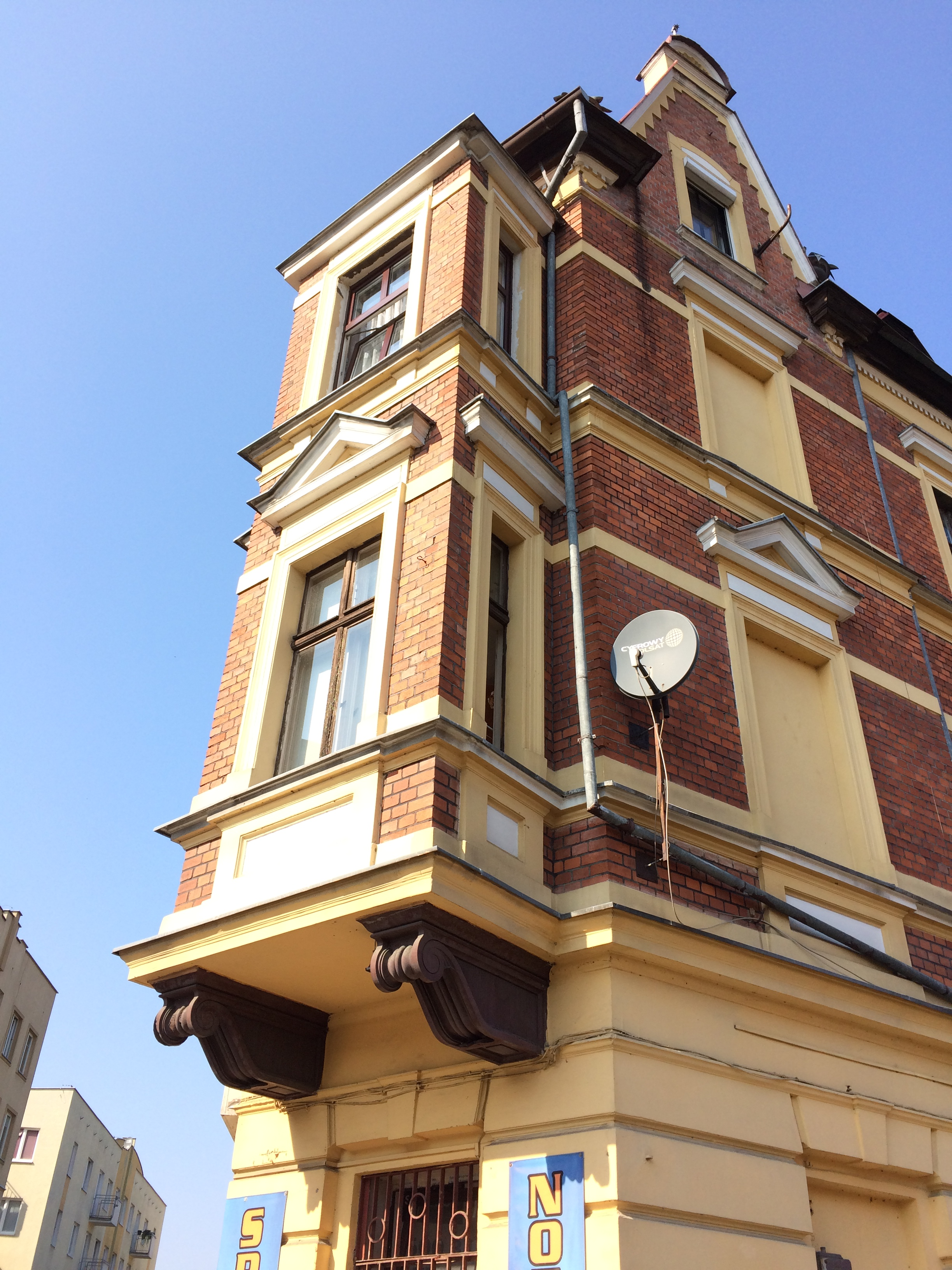
Corner bay window

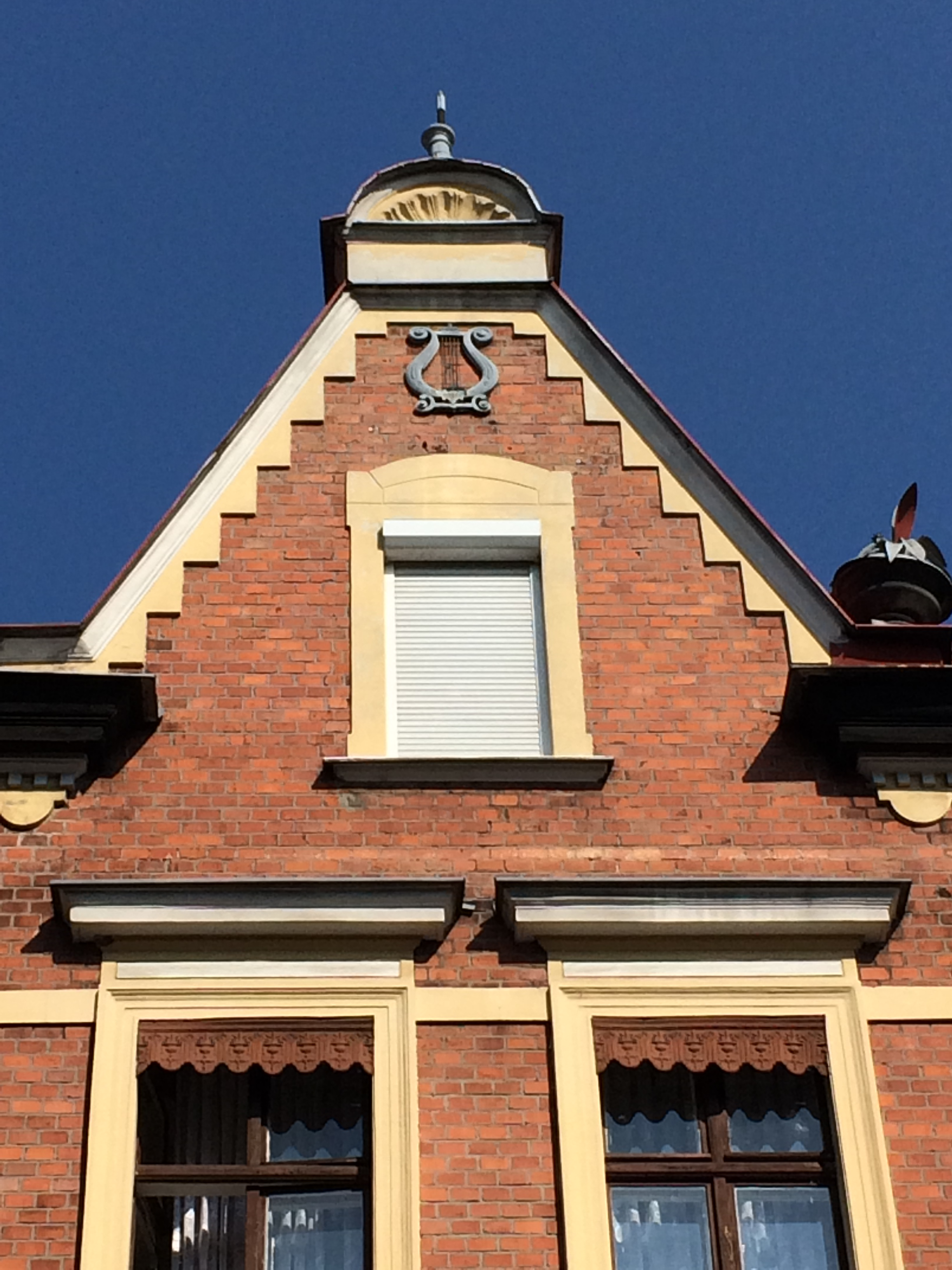
Gable

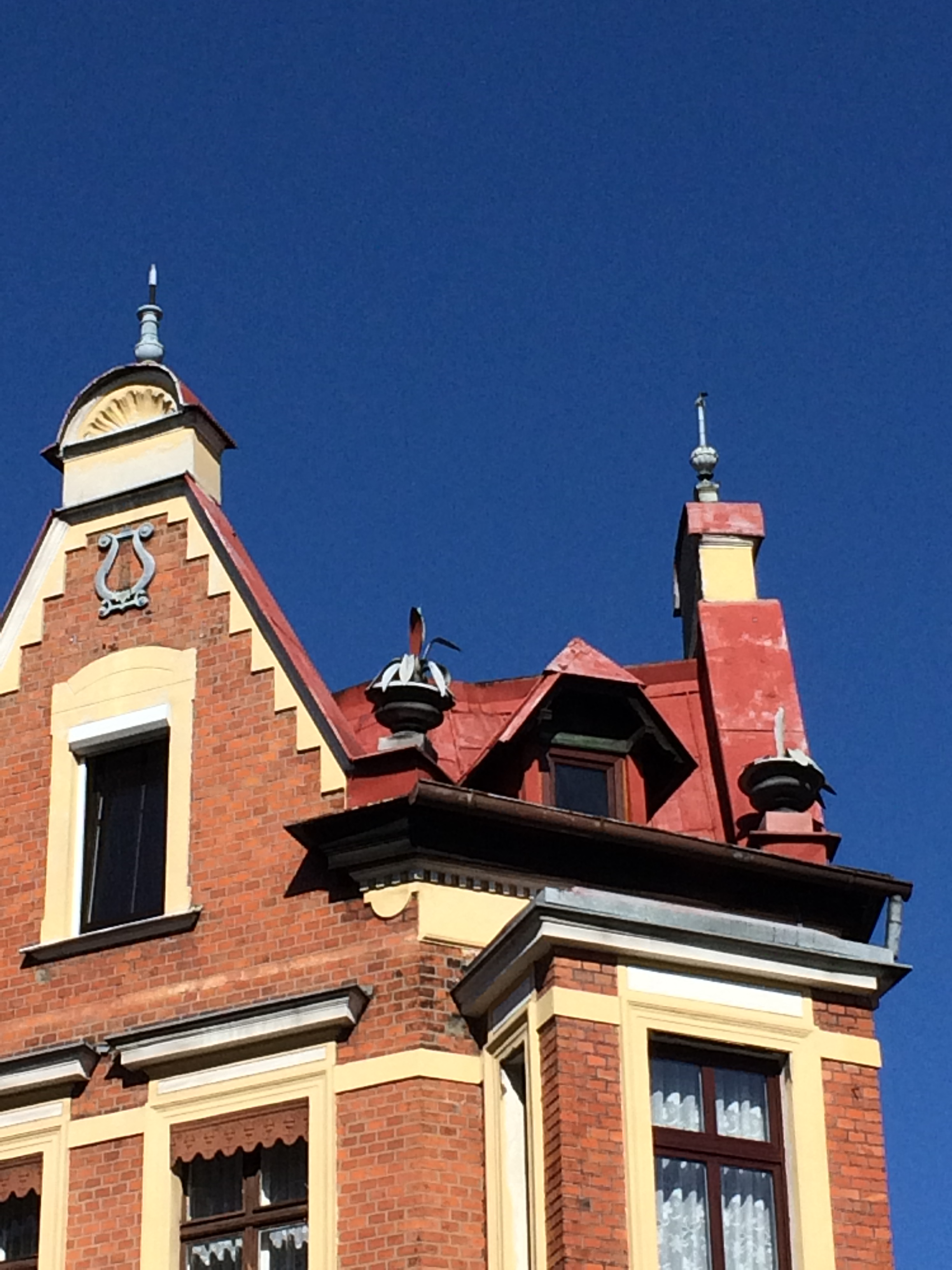
Top finials

=== Tenement at 10 ===
1888

Neoclassical architecture

The plot at then Mauß Straße 8 has long been a place for an industrial building related to the nearby foundry complex F. Eberhardt. In 1888, the Eberhardt family had this house erected, for renting purposes, although several members of the Eberhardt family lived also there till the outbreak of World War II.

Recently renovated, the facade displays symmetry and simplicity in its neoclassical features. One can notice the entry porch, underlined on the first floor by two round top windows, flanked by pilasters.

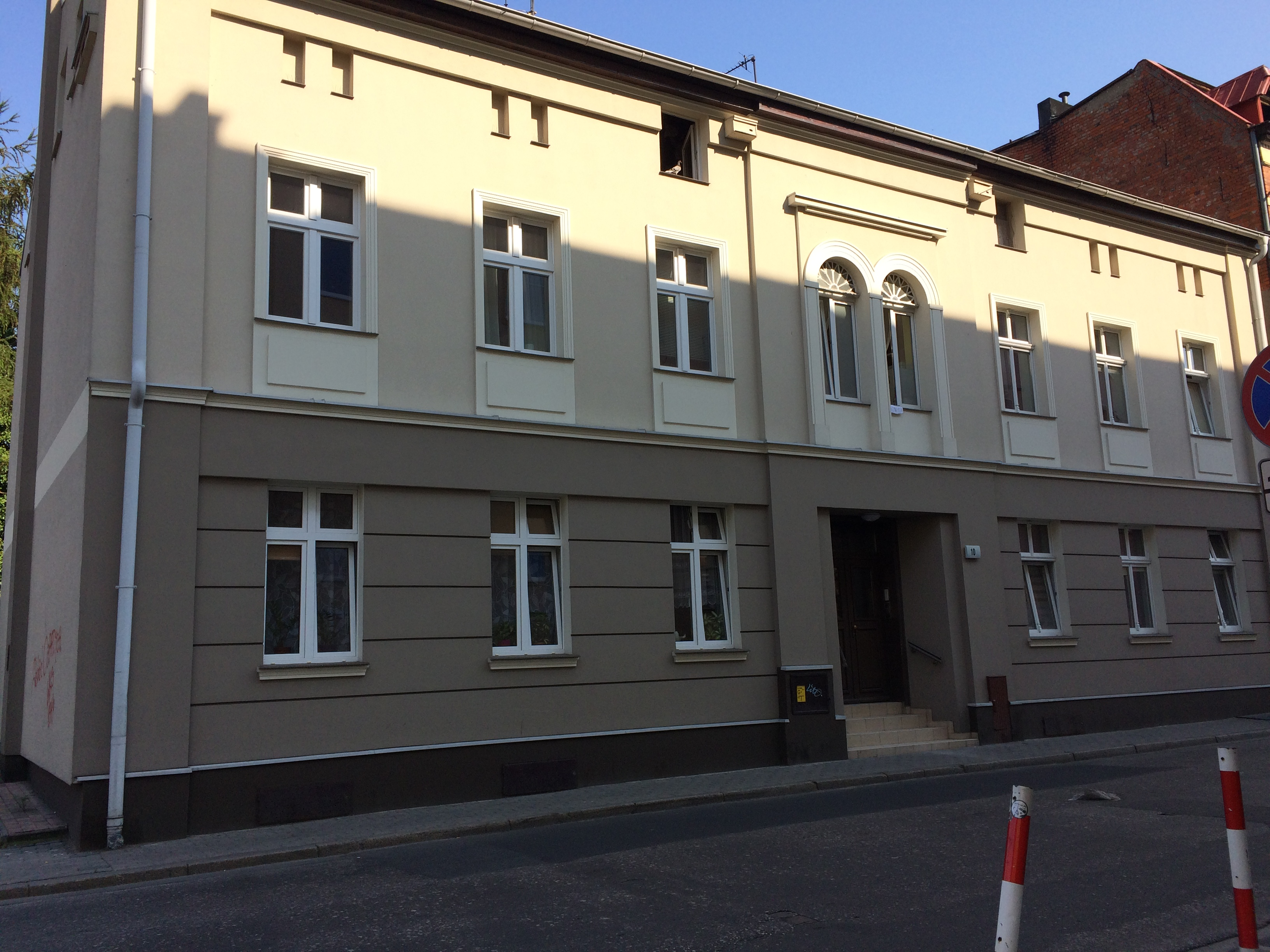
Main facade on the street

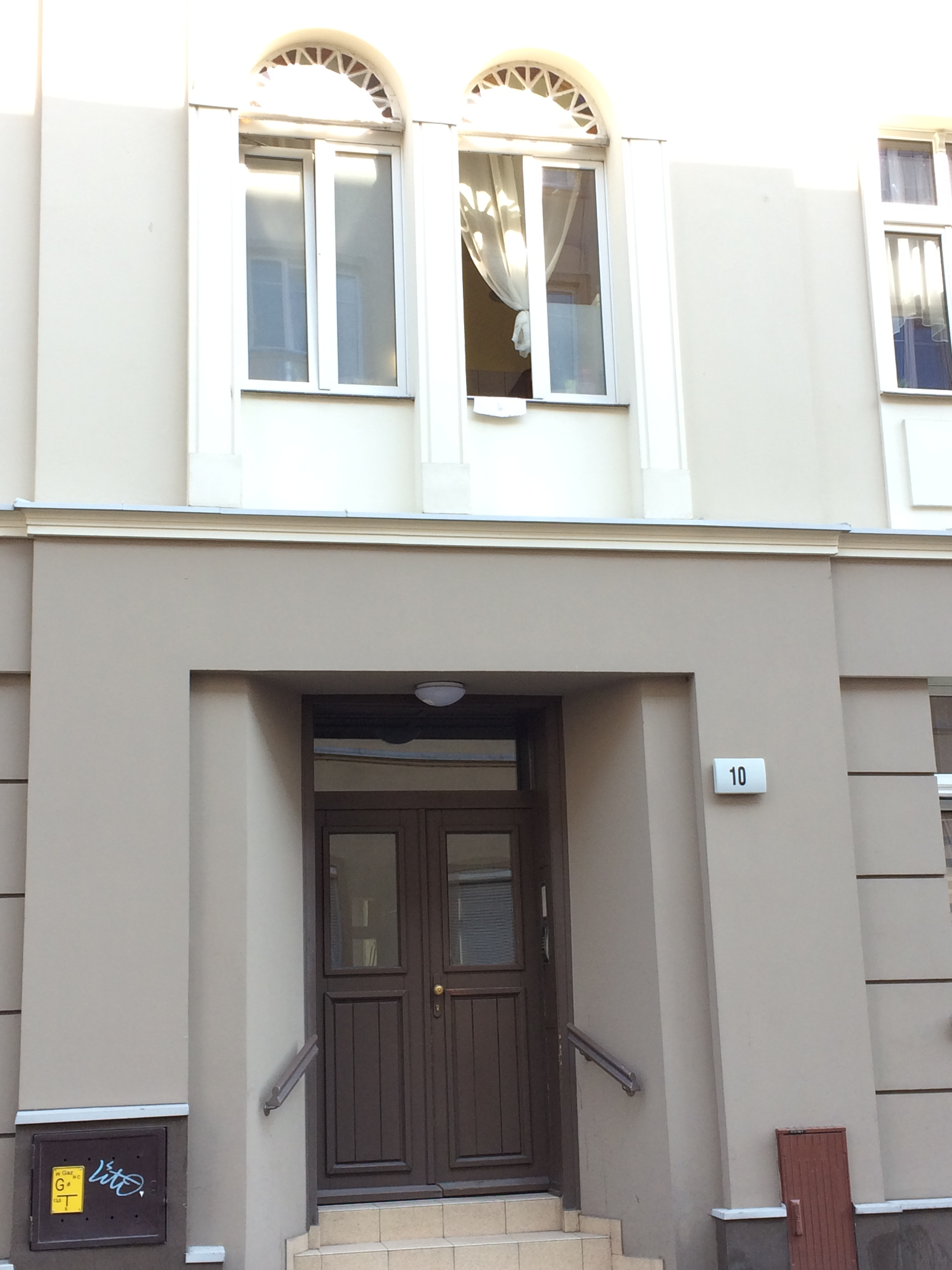
Detail of the Portal gate

=== Tenement at 12, corner with Czartoryskiego street ===
1890s

Eclecticism

The tenement at Berliner straße 30, was the property of Wilhelm Baesler a smith master, who moved to Bromberg in the mid-1860s. The following landlord was also a smith, Julius Schmiede; his son Erich, a smith master, moved out in the mid-1920s, but lived in Bydgoszcz until the start of World War II.

Both elevations on the street have arc pedimented windows, and the facade on Świętej Trojcy also displays pilasters on its ends. A wrought iron gate parts the building, giving access to a backyard on Czartoryskiego street.

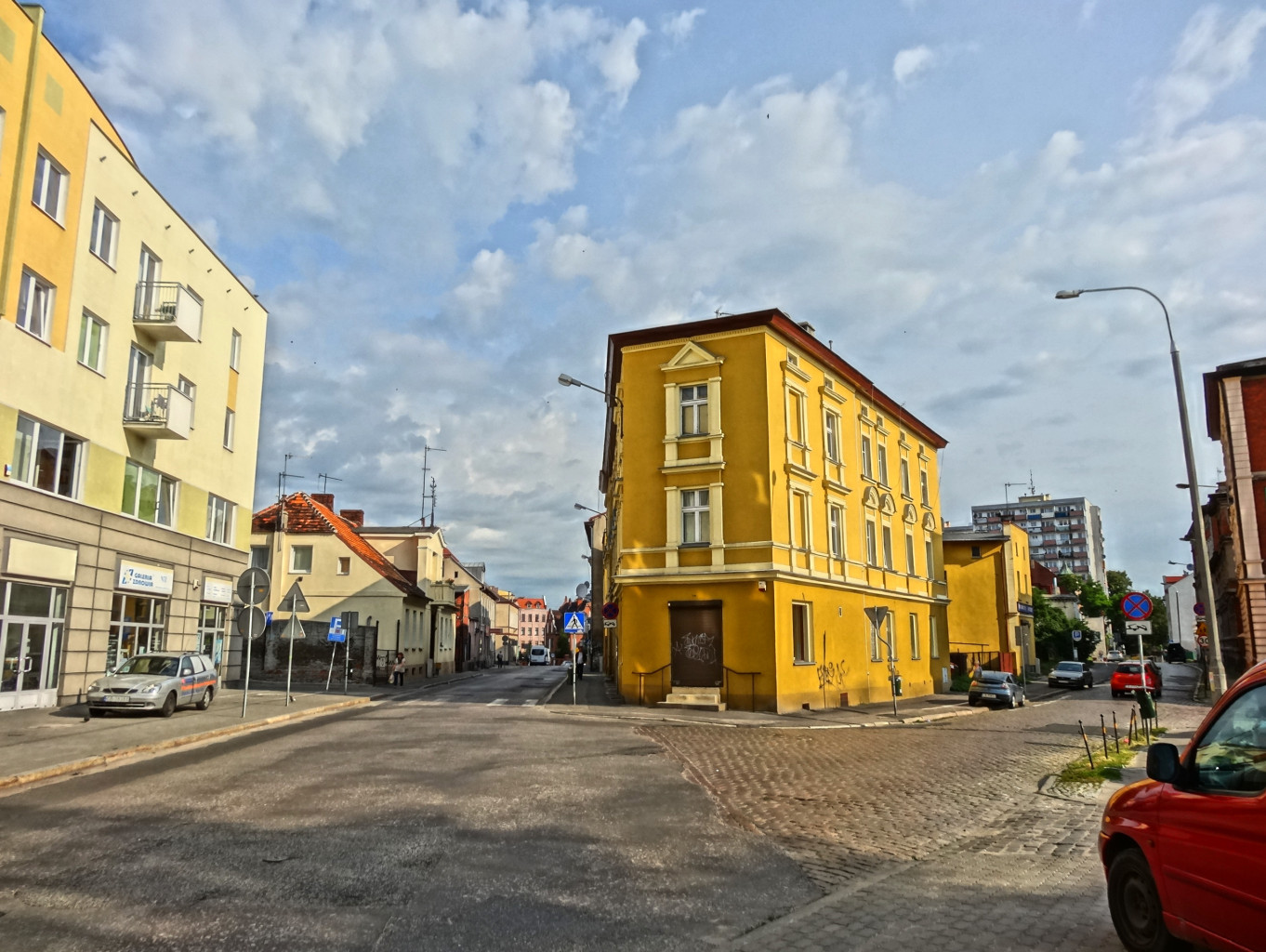
Corner house from the street

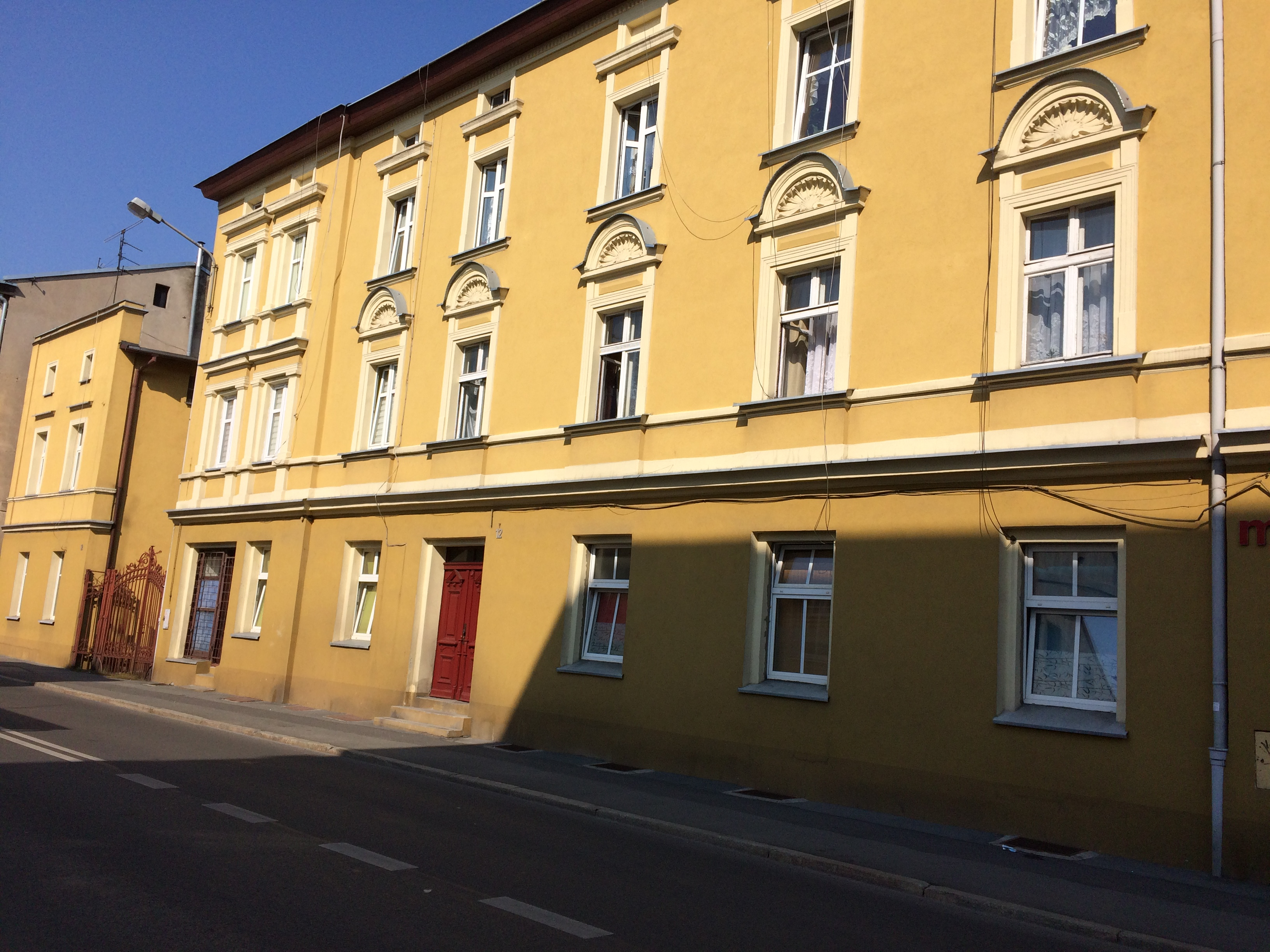
Elevations on the street

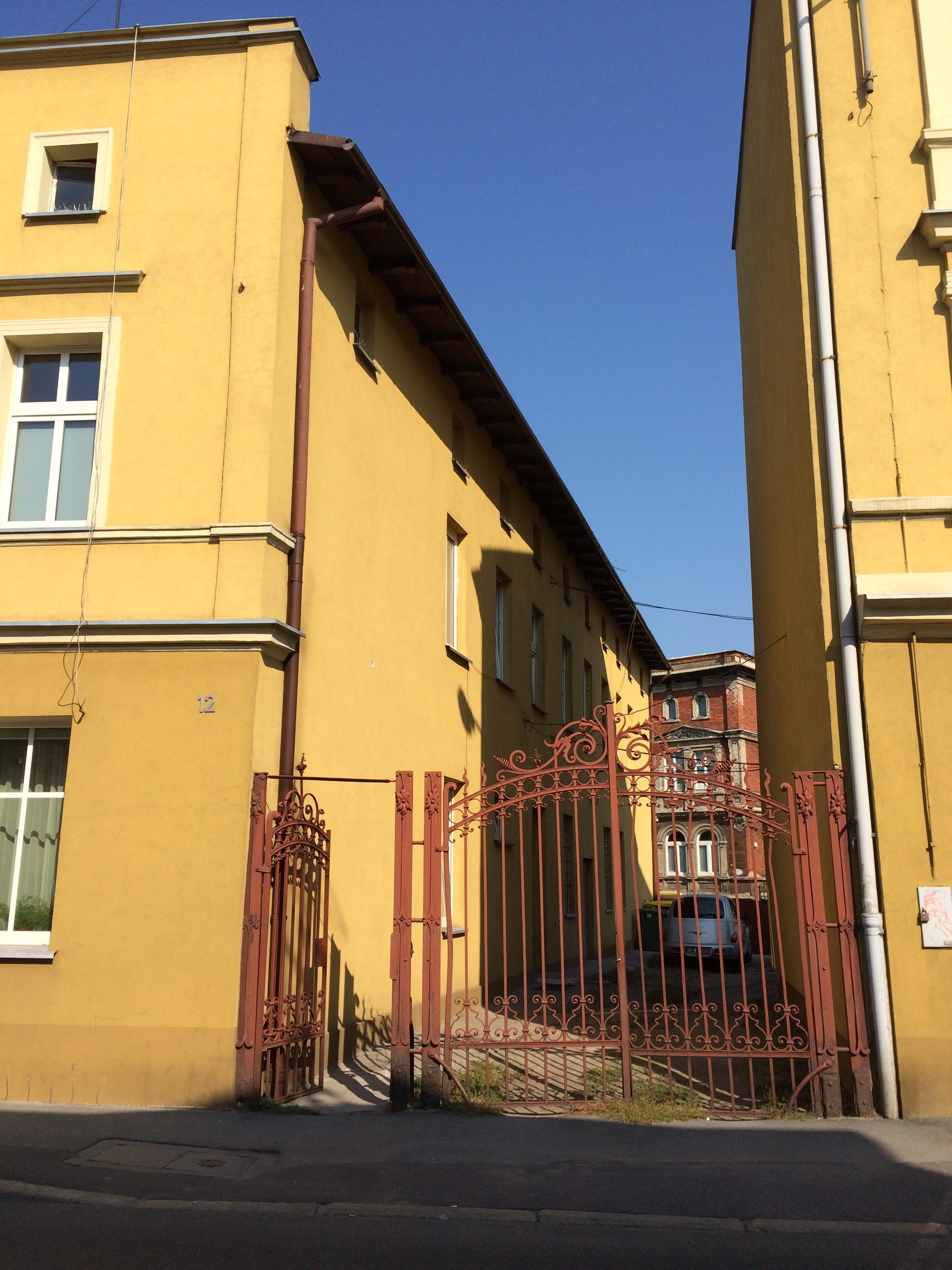
Wrought iron gate, with Franke's spirit refinery building in the background

=== Tenement at 13 ===
1860s

Eclecticism

The plot of Berliner straße 3 was built on in 1885 by the new owner, Marie Gawe, the widow of a locksmith. In the 1890s, it moved to the hands of another locksmith, Ernst Dittmann. On 1 March 1923, engineer Stefan Ciszewski set up there a small workshop, which soon grew into a large company. In 1925, it was registered under the name Fabryka Produktów Elektrotechnicznych inż. Stefan Ciszewski i S-ka, Sp. z o. o.

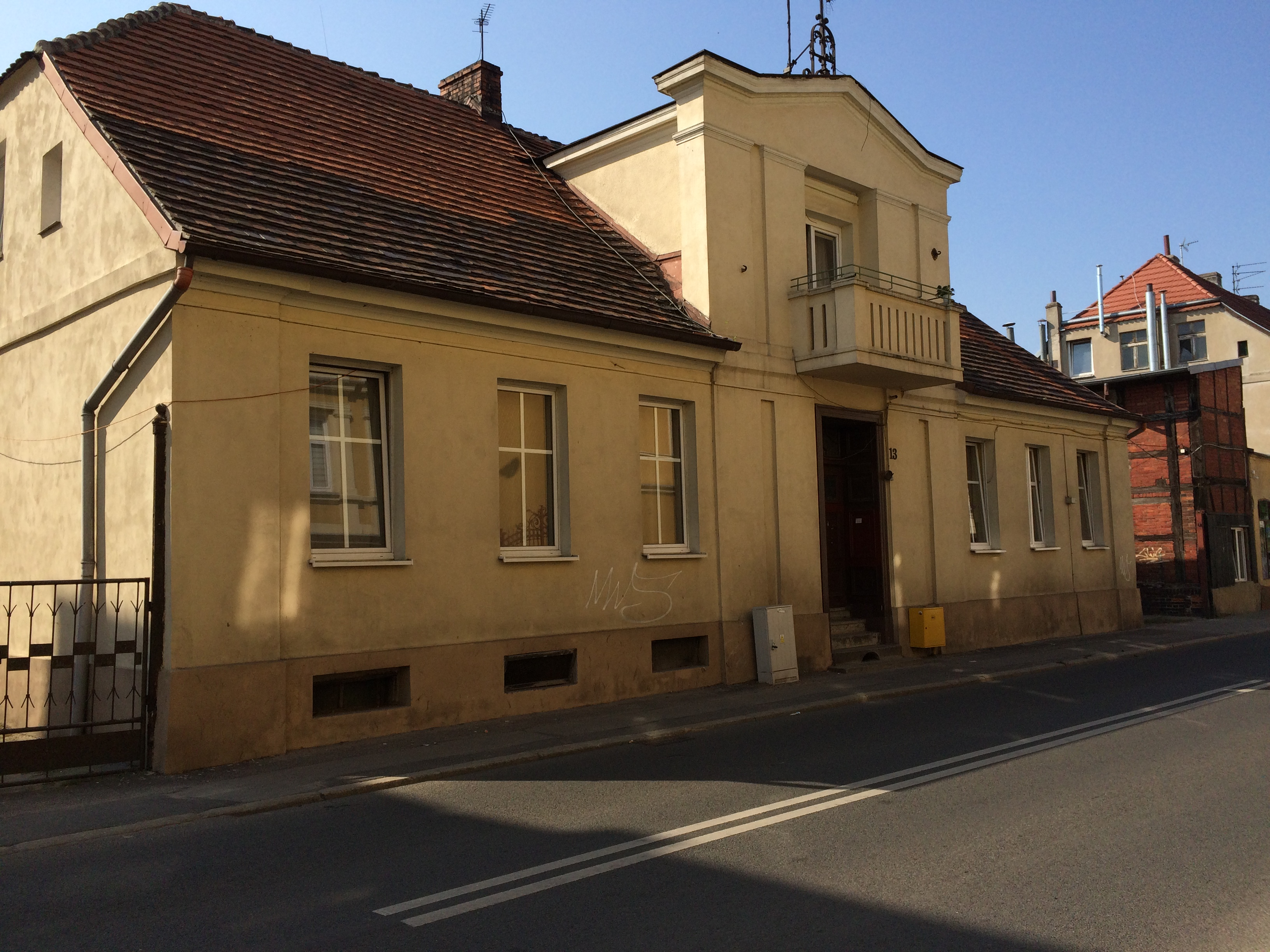
View from the street

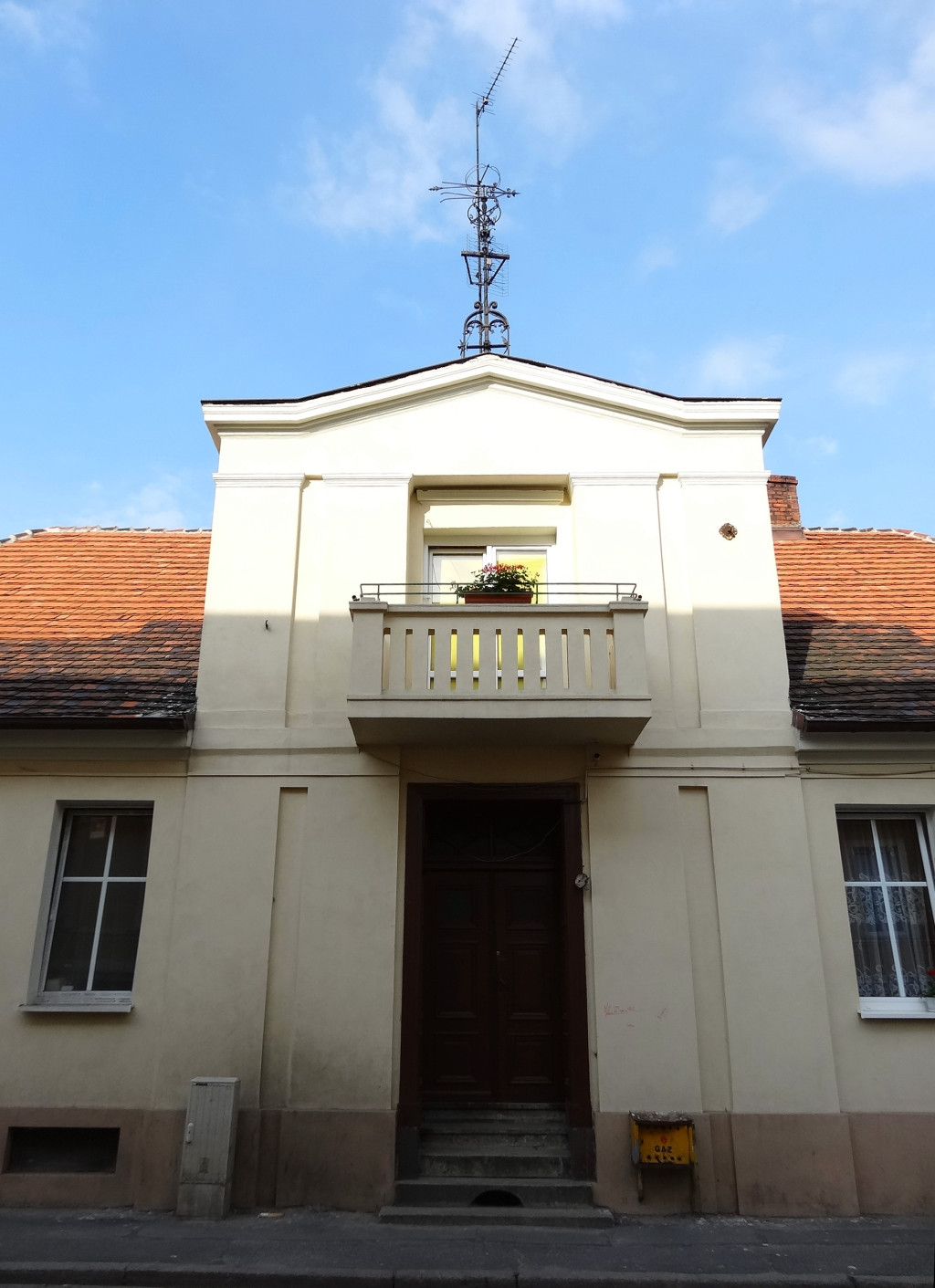
Portal gate

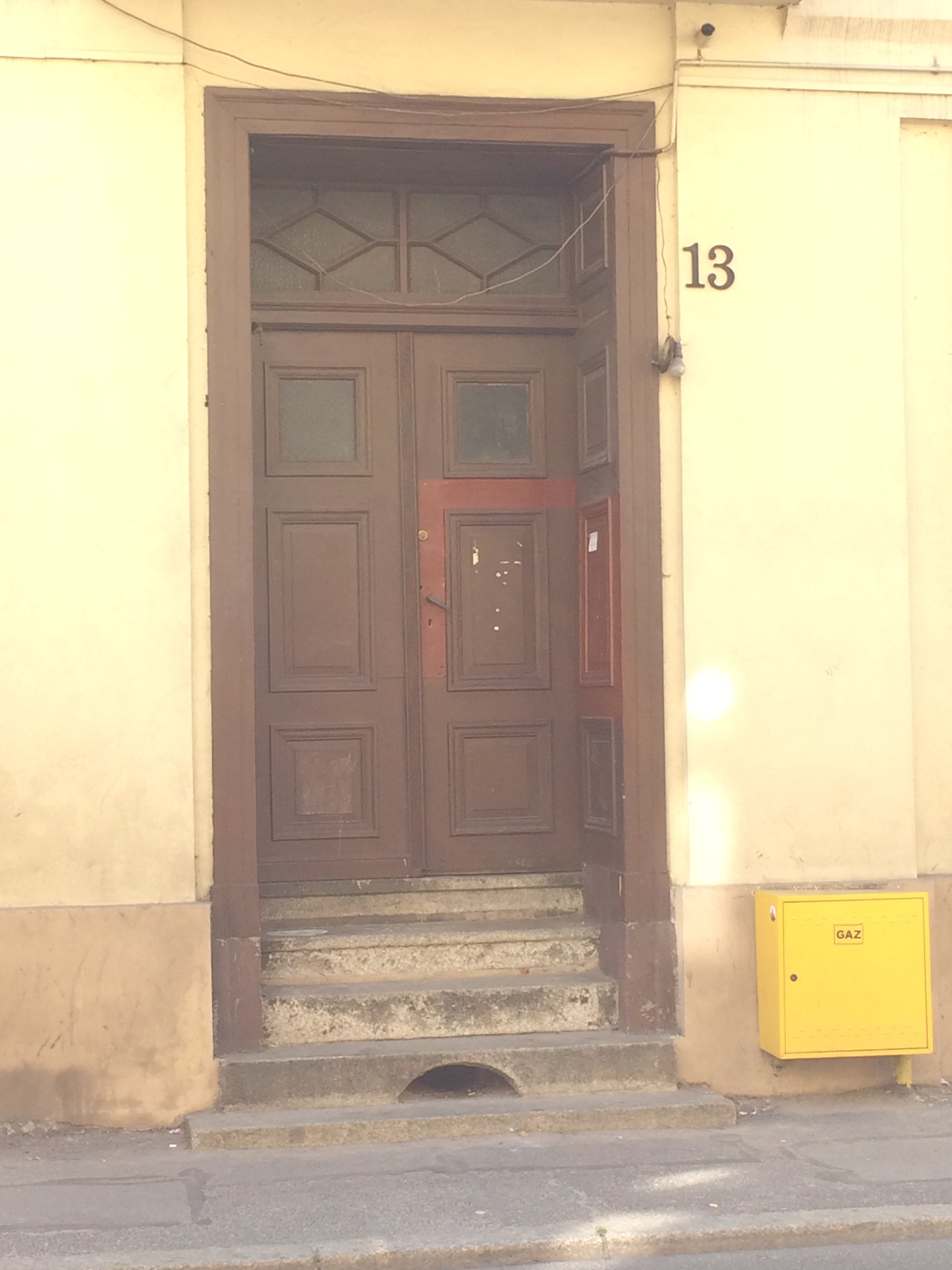
Entry door

=== Tenement at 18 ===
1870

Neoclassical architecture

Berliner straße 27's first indication dates back to 1872, where the building is mentioned to have Hermann Jacobi, a merchant, for landlord. In 1890, it moved to the ownership of a baker, Friedrich Rosenau, living at Berliner straße 5 (today's Nr.17), just across the street. He later moved to a house at Nr.18. At the turn of the 20th century, a carpenter Stanislaw Tylewski became the new owner.

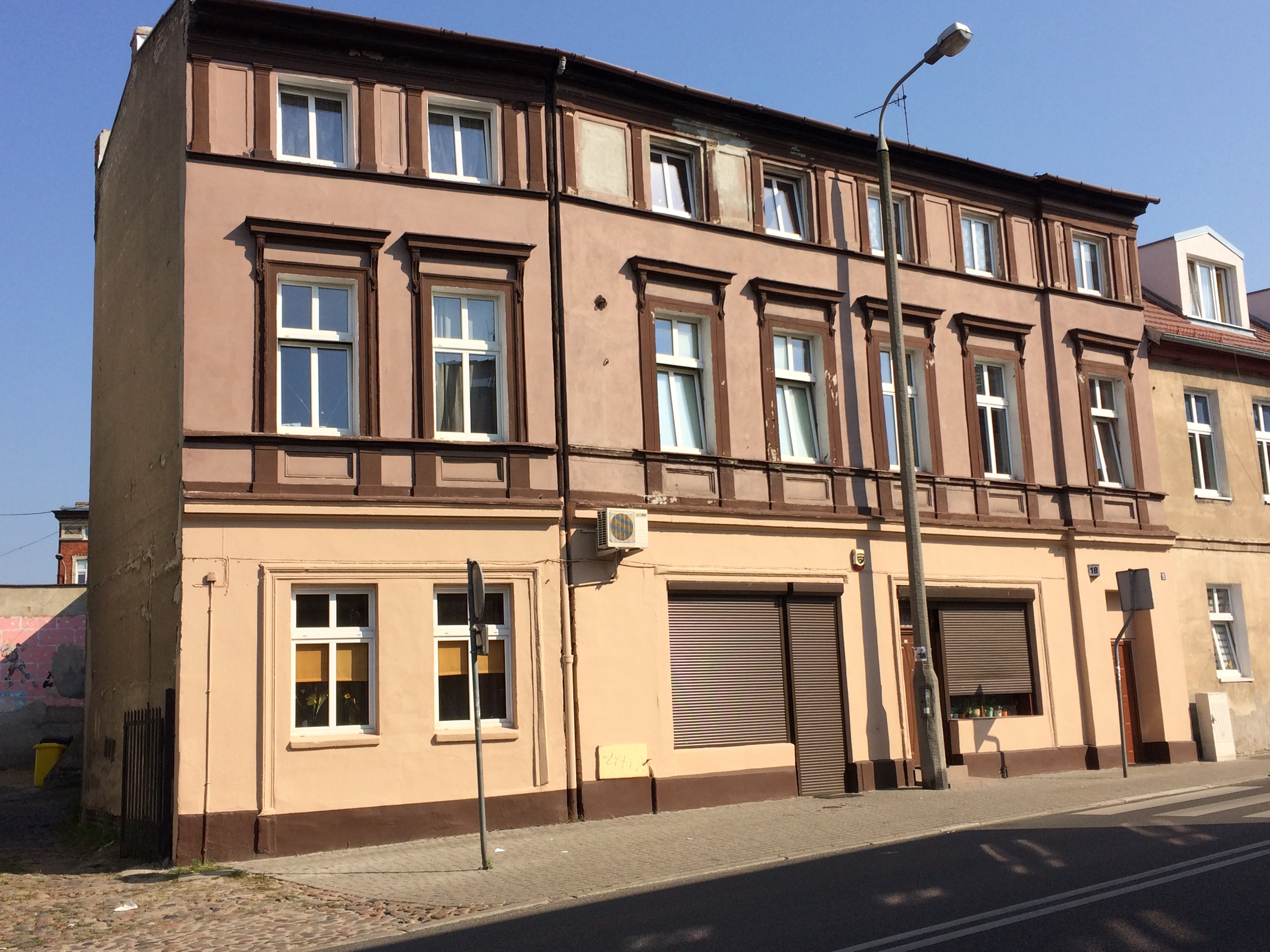
Main elevation on the street

=== Gustav Weihe house at 20 ===
1869

Neo-Baroque

The plot bore successively the numbers 441, then 16 and 26 at Berliner straße. Gustav Weihe, a mason, was its first landlord. Anna Fricke, the widow of another mason, took possession of the house in 1890. The edifice remained in the hands of the Friske family until World War II.

This large house has a low gambrel roof and its huge neo-baroque wall dormer facing the street.

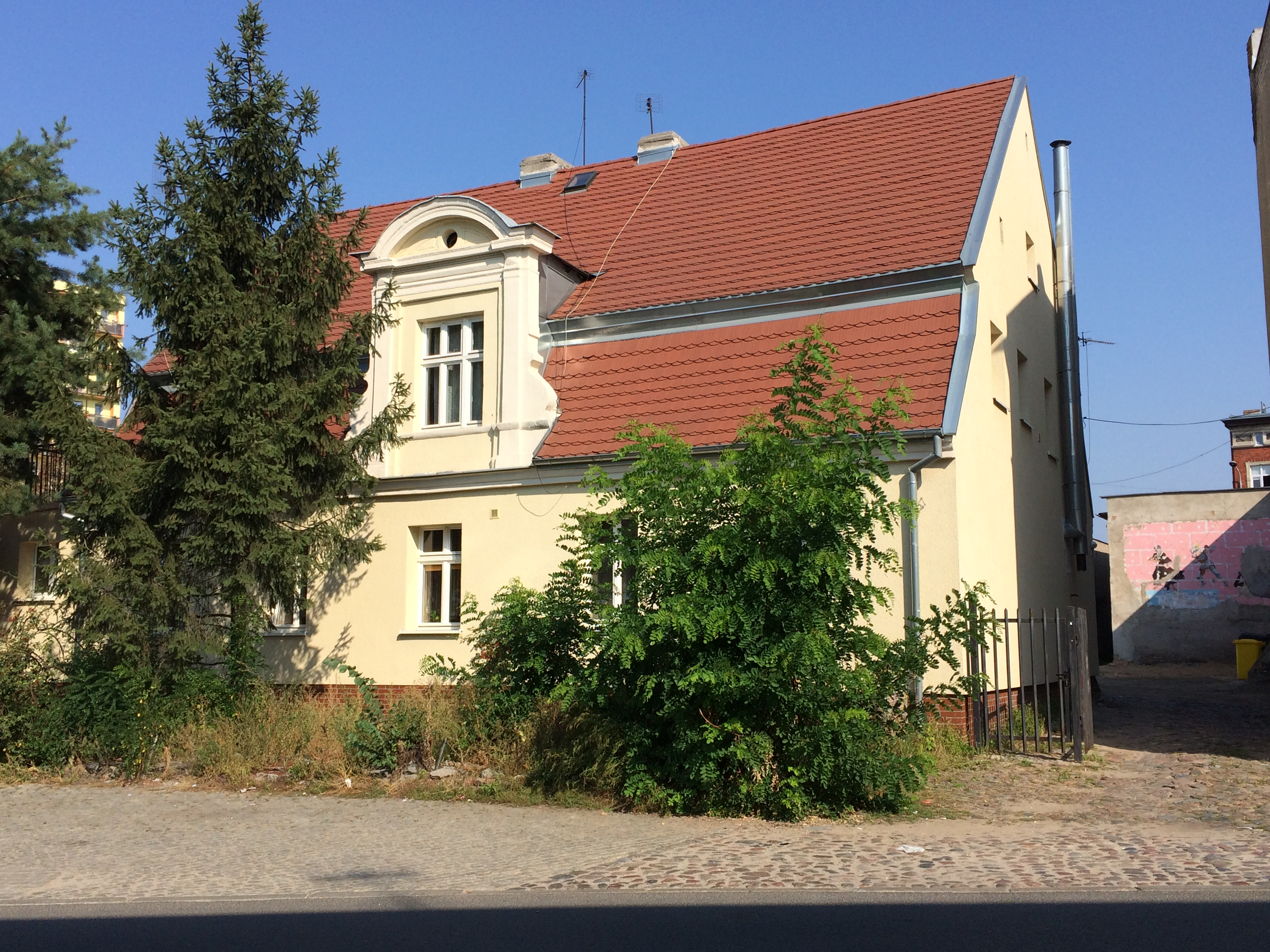
View from the street

=== Tenement at 21 ===
1898

Neo-Renaissance, elements of Neo-Baroque

The house, initially at Berliner straße 5a was first the property of Friedrich Heise widow, who has been lived at Berliner straße 5 (today's Nr.17) till the start of World War I. Afterwards, the building has been owned by a purser at the 14th (3rd Pomeranian) Infantry "Count Schwerin", Anton Dütting. In the 1920s, Antoni Weynerowski and his wife lived there.

The building is an architectural mix of a Neo-Renaissance facade with Neo-Baroque elements. The avant-corps have pilasters and a curved pediment adorned with a festoon. On the elevation, there are bossages and a corbel table. The elevation on the courtyard displays an arched passage leading to the main door, protected by a wrought iron gate. In addition, a tower-like element stands in the corner of the house.

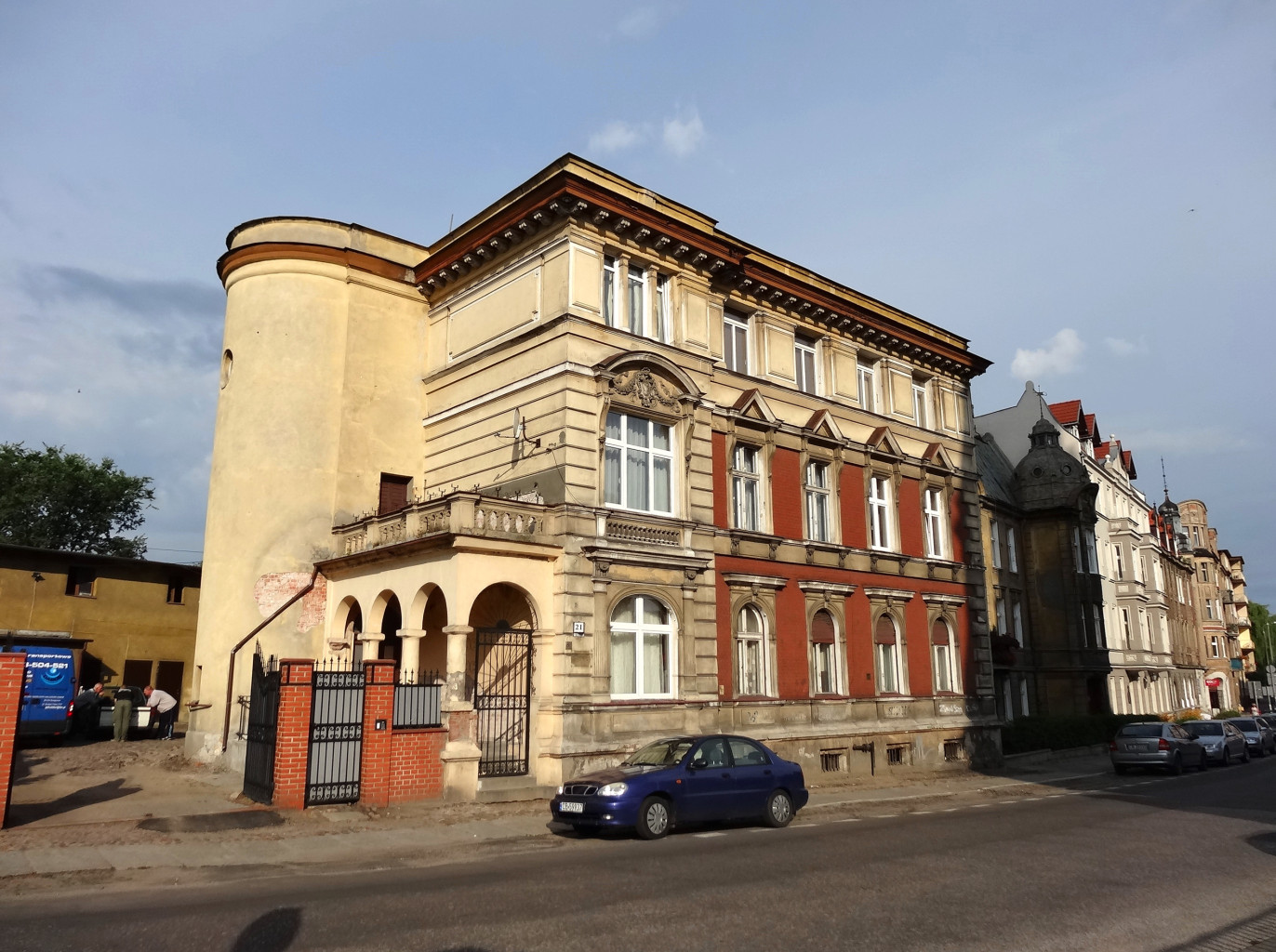
View from the street

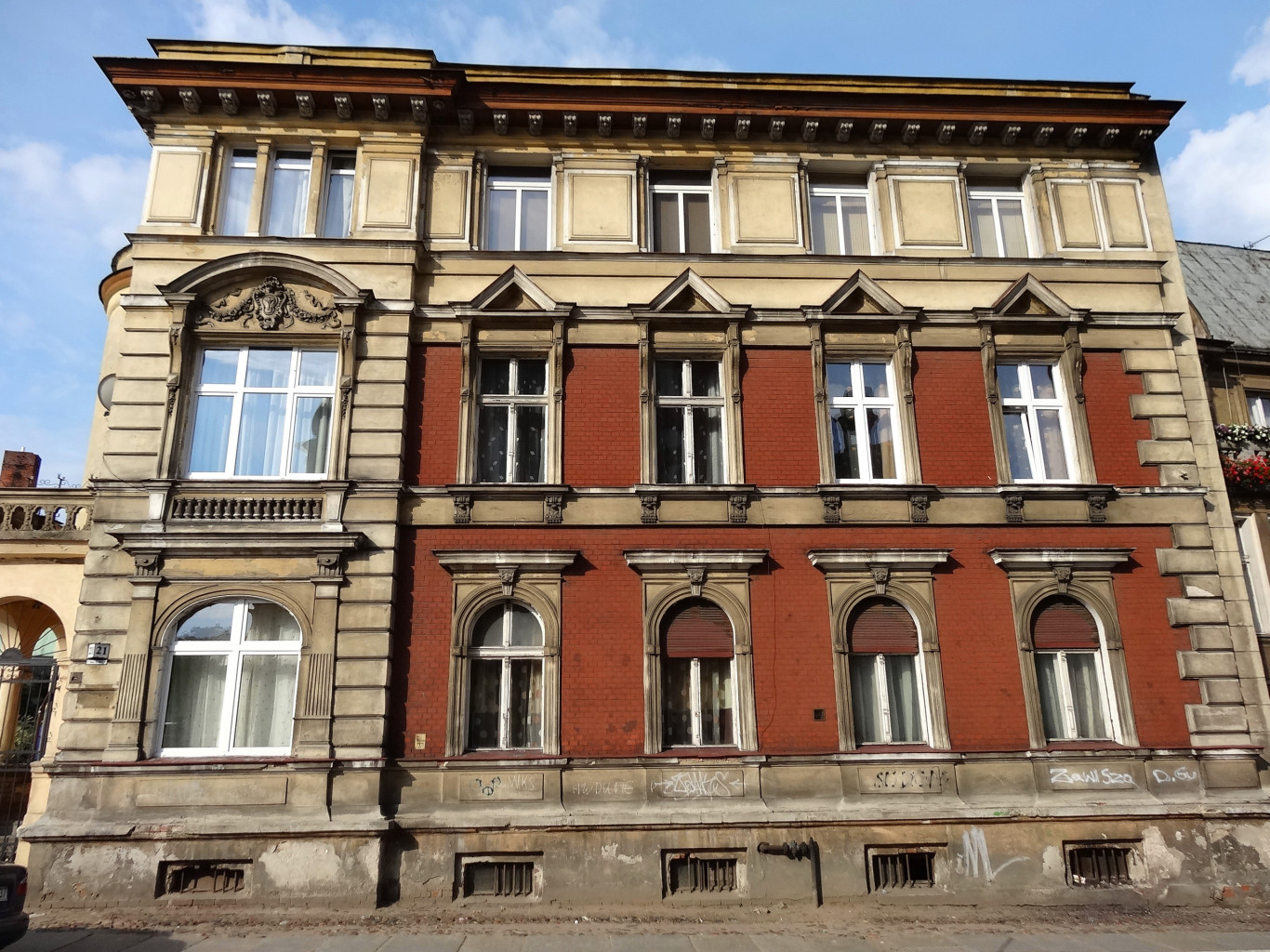
Main elevation

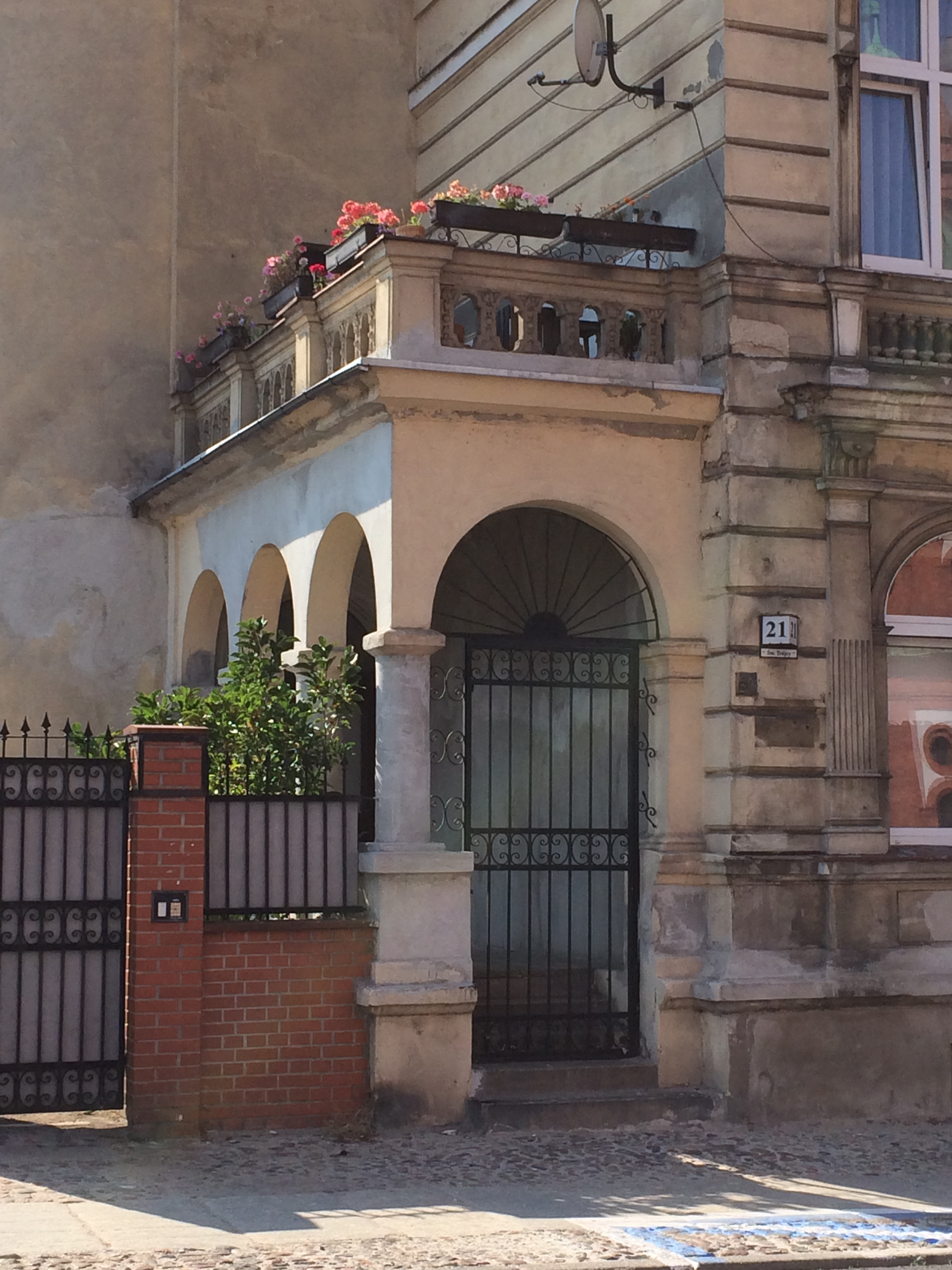
Entry gate and terrace

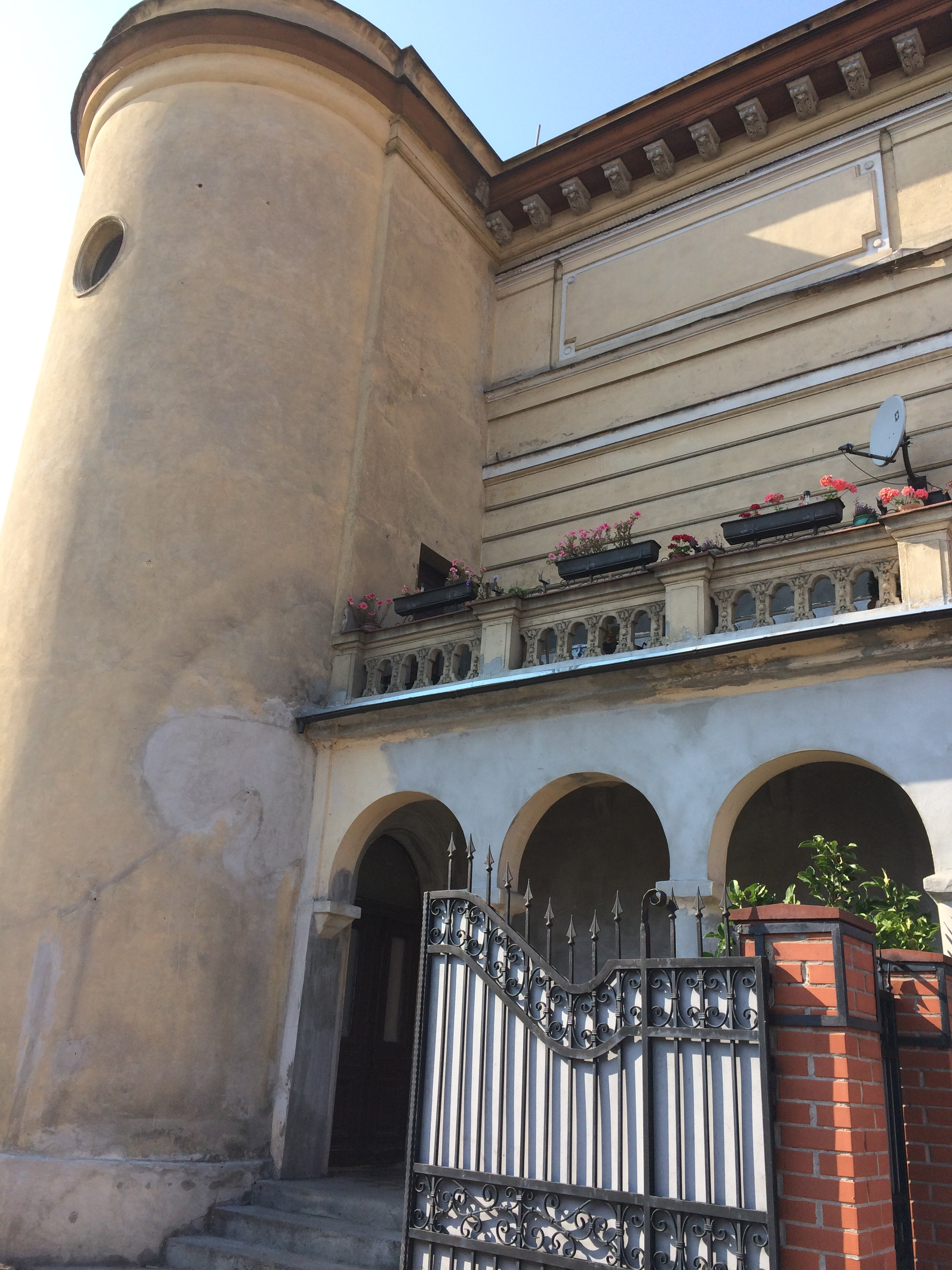
Courtyard entry

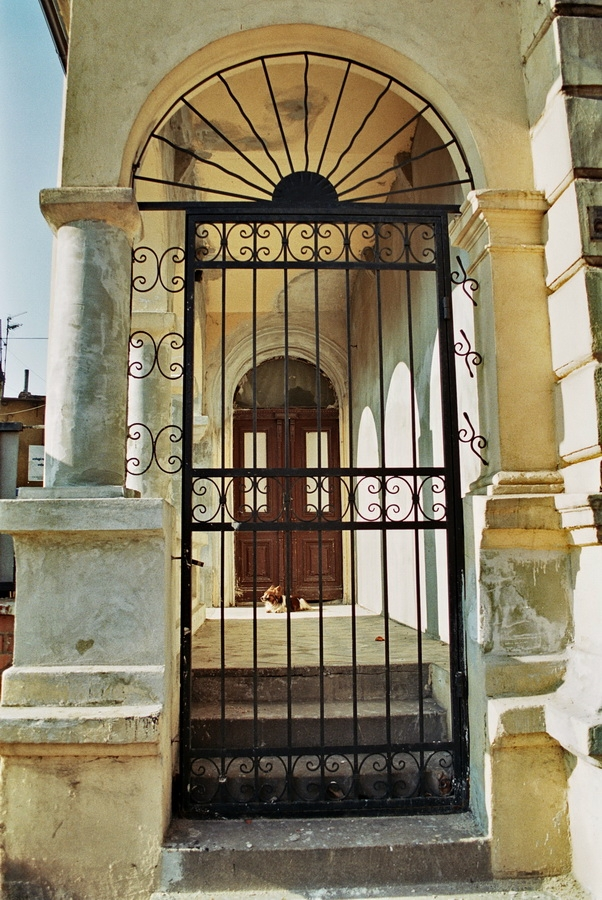
Wrought iron gate

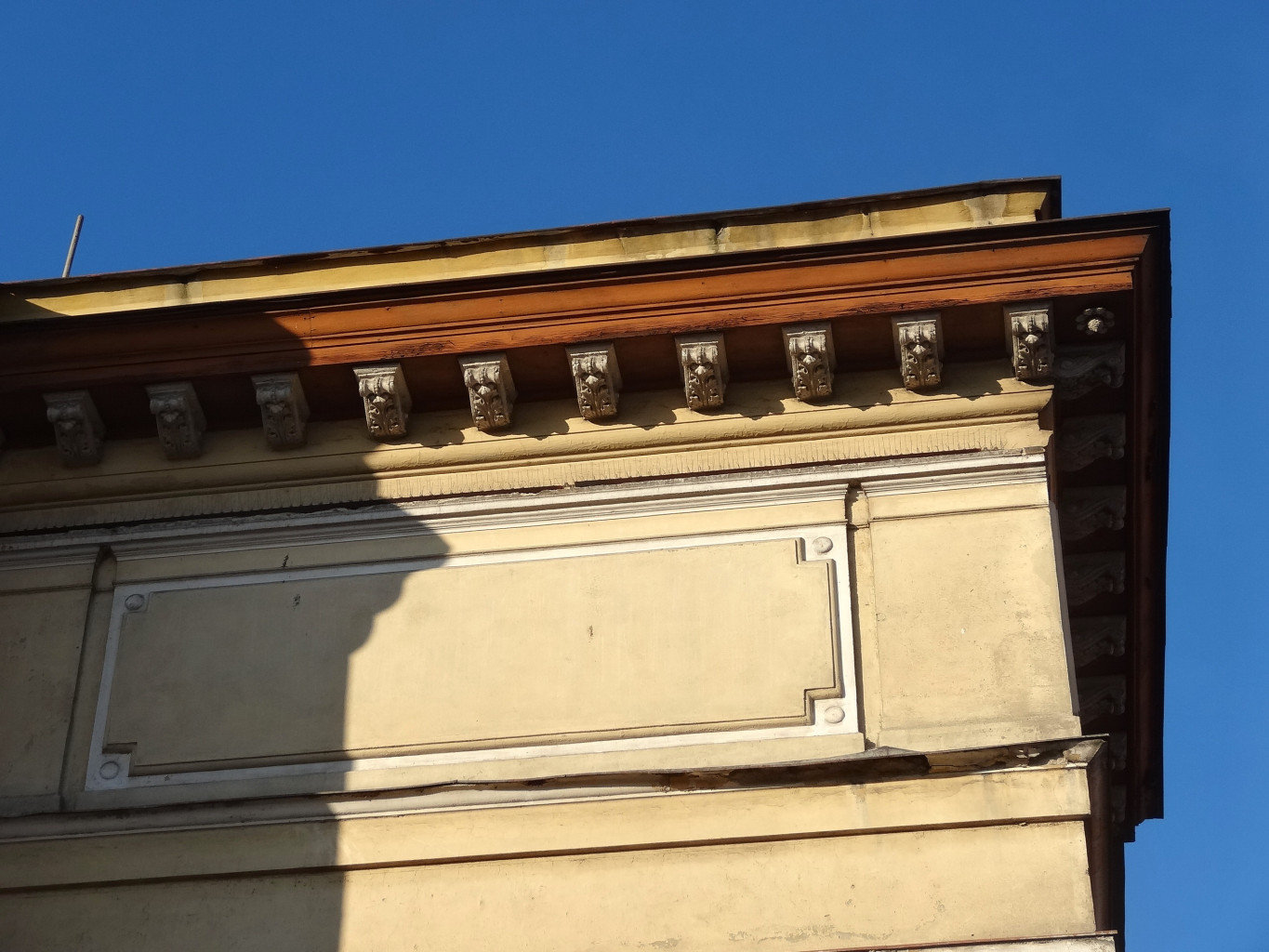
Corbel table

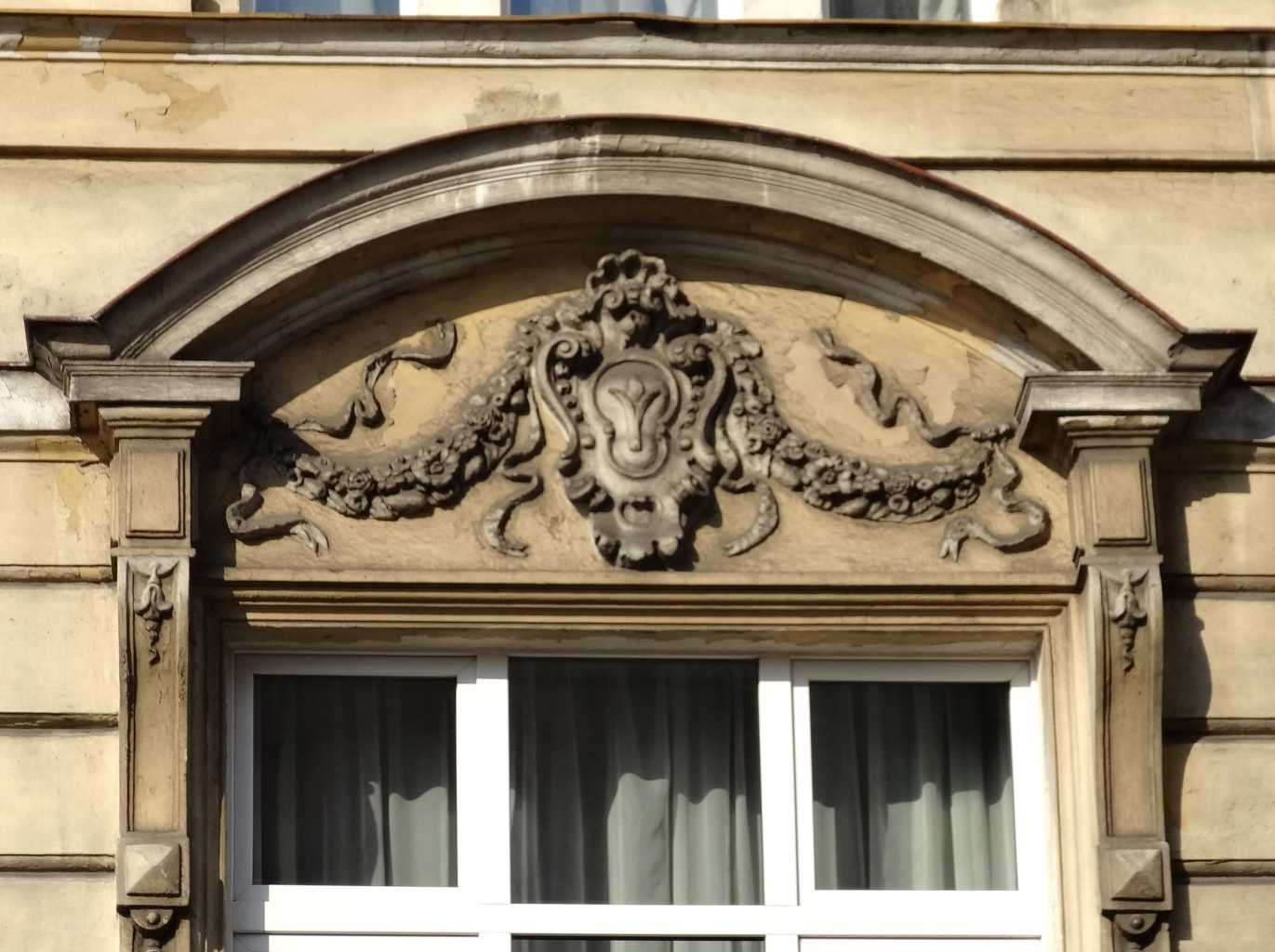
Pediment detail

=== Franz Ciechanowski Tenement, at 23 ===
1903, by Ernst Peter

Art Nouveau

Franz Ciechanowski was an entrepreneur, whose building and engineering company has been thriving, with projects not only in Bromberg, but also in other parts of the German Empire. He bought the plot at Berliner Straße 6 in 1896, and had the current tenement built in 1903–1904, by architect Ernst Peter from Berlin. The house is still owned by the Ciechanowski family.

Ernst Peter typically applied Berlin Art Nouveau style: masks, heads, figures, plants and sea waves, atlantes supporting a balcony, slender female figures flanking the entry gate. On both sides of the elevation, at the first level, are scenes depicting workers activities, probably as a reference to Franz Ciechanowski's business. From the outside, the house looks like a palace, but in fact it comprises a string of different habitations. The front elevation is not aligned with its neighbors, since originally there was a small garden, separated by wrought iron fence.

Inside, some of the numerous murals realized in 1907 by Brunon Gęstwicki (1882–1969), Franciszek Ciechanowski's nephew, from Toruń, are still preserved. Originally, the whole staircase, including the vaulted ceiling, was covered with paintings, but many have been lost during renovations. Preserved fragments refer to the Vienna Secession and works from Jacek Malczewski or Wlastimil Hofman. The edifice underwent a thorough renovation in 2020.

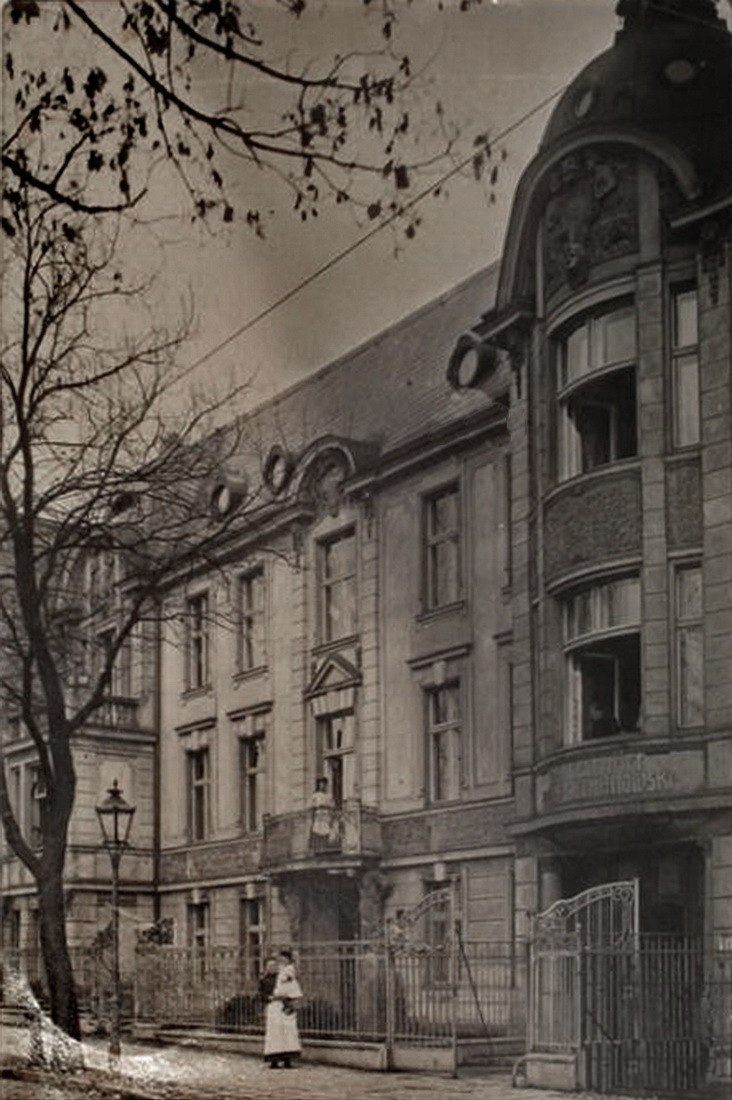
The building with its fenced garden (1909)

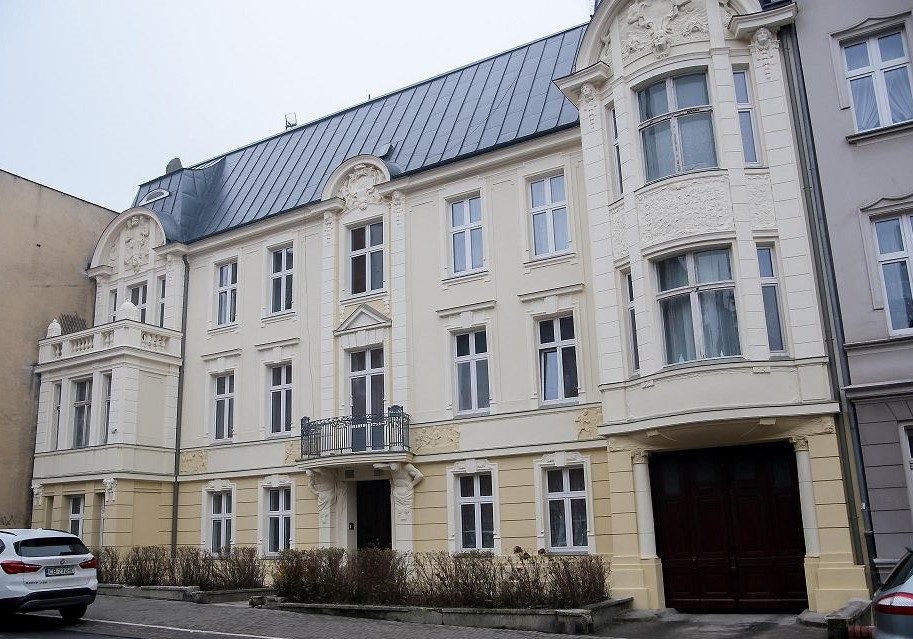
View of the elevation from the street

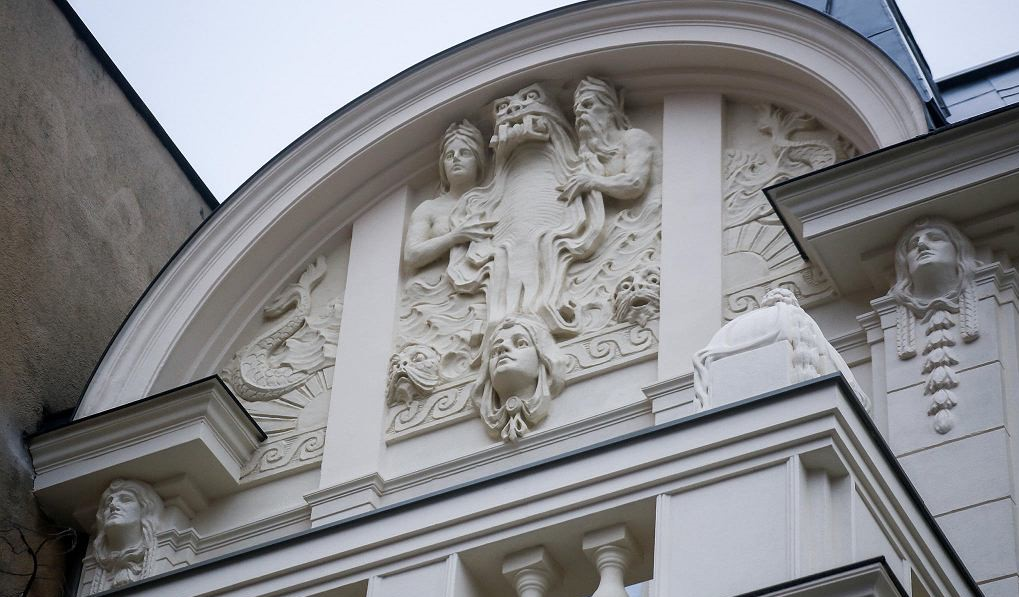
Detail of the top gable

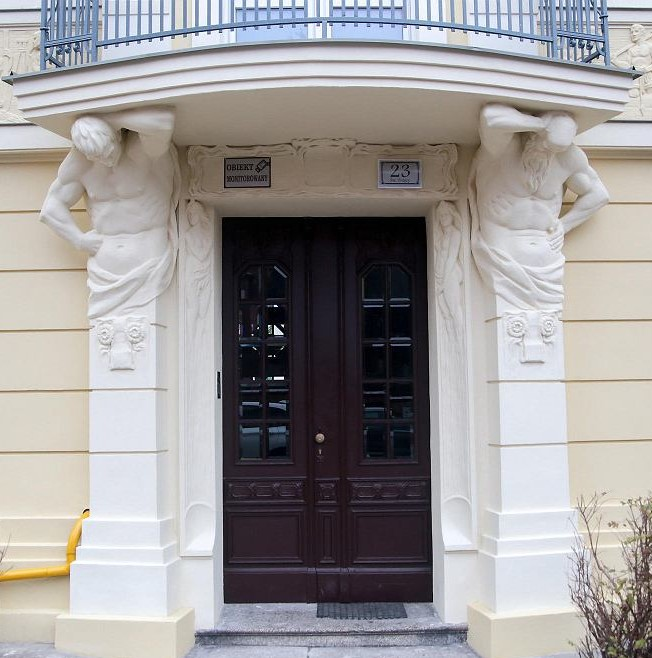
View of the entrance portal with atlases

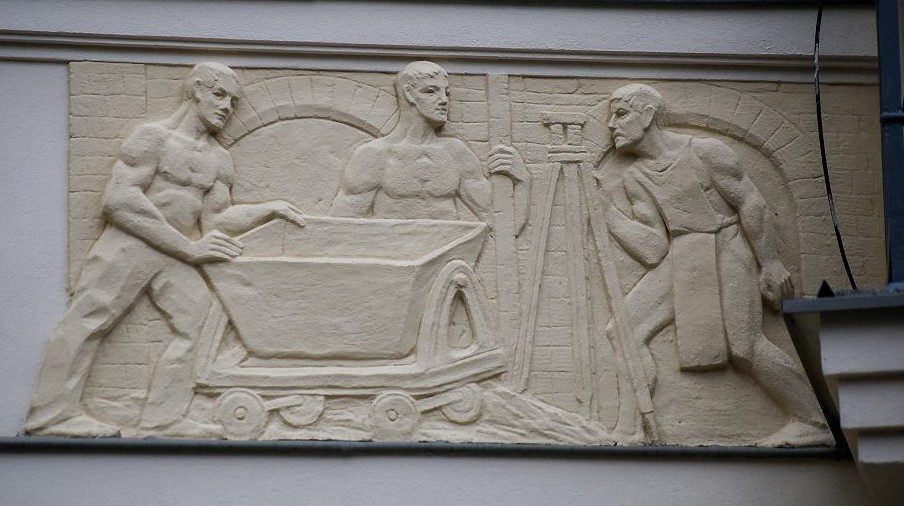
Bas-relief scenes

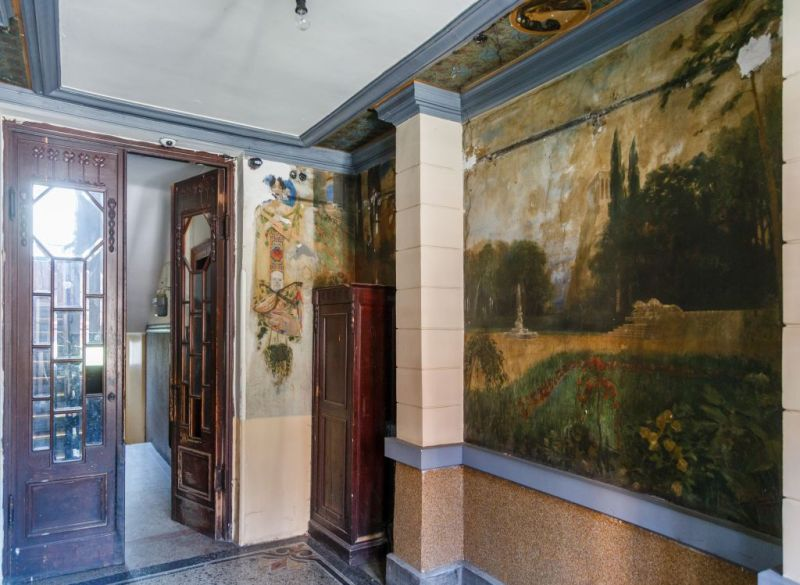
Indoor paintings

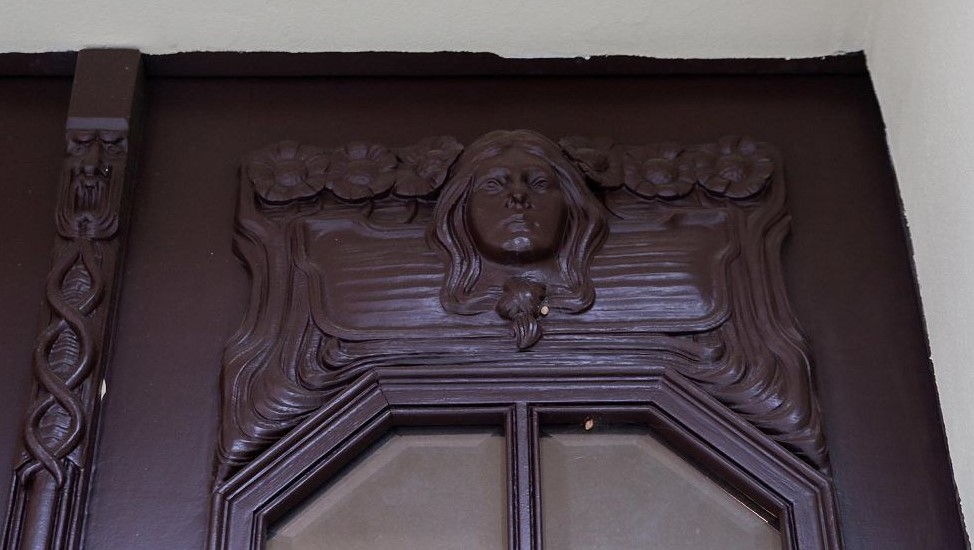
Decoration of a door

=== Tenement at 25 ===
1905

Historicism, elements of Art Nouveau

The house, initially at Berliner straße 6a was first the property of Johann Ceglarski, a rentier. It then moved from 1910 to 1920 the hands of Erich Schaumann, a railway servant. In this house was born the poet and journalist Malgorzata Szulczynska (Feb 27, 1957). She was a journalist dealing with poetry, documentaries and literary critics; she wrote the first biography in Poland of Halina Poświatowska. She also owned an art exhibition gallery in Bydgoszcz, "Pod Trzynastką" English: Under Thirteen, at Śląska street 13/2. She died on December 12, 2003. In 2004, a plaque was unveiled on the tenement to commemorate her birthplace.

The building displays a harmonious facade, with two large bay windows crossing two levels, topped by a terrace. The facade is crowned by a bell dome gable and four wall dormers. Several cartouches adorned with floral motifs or female figures herald the upcoming of Art Nouveau style.

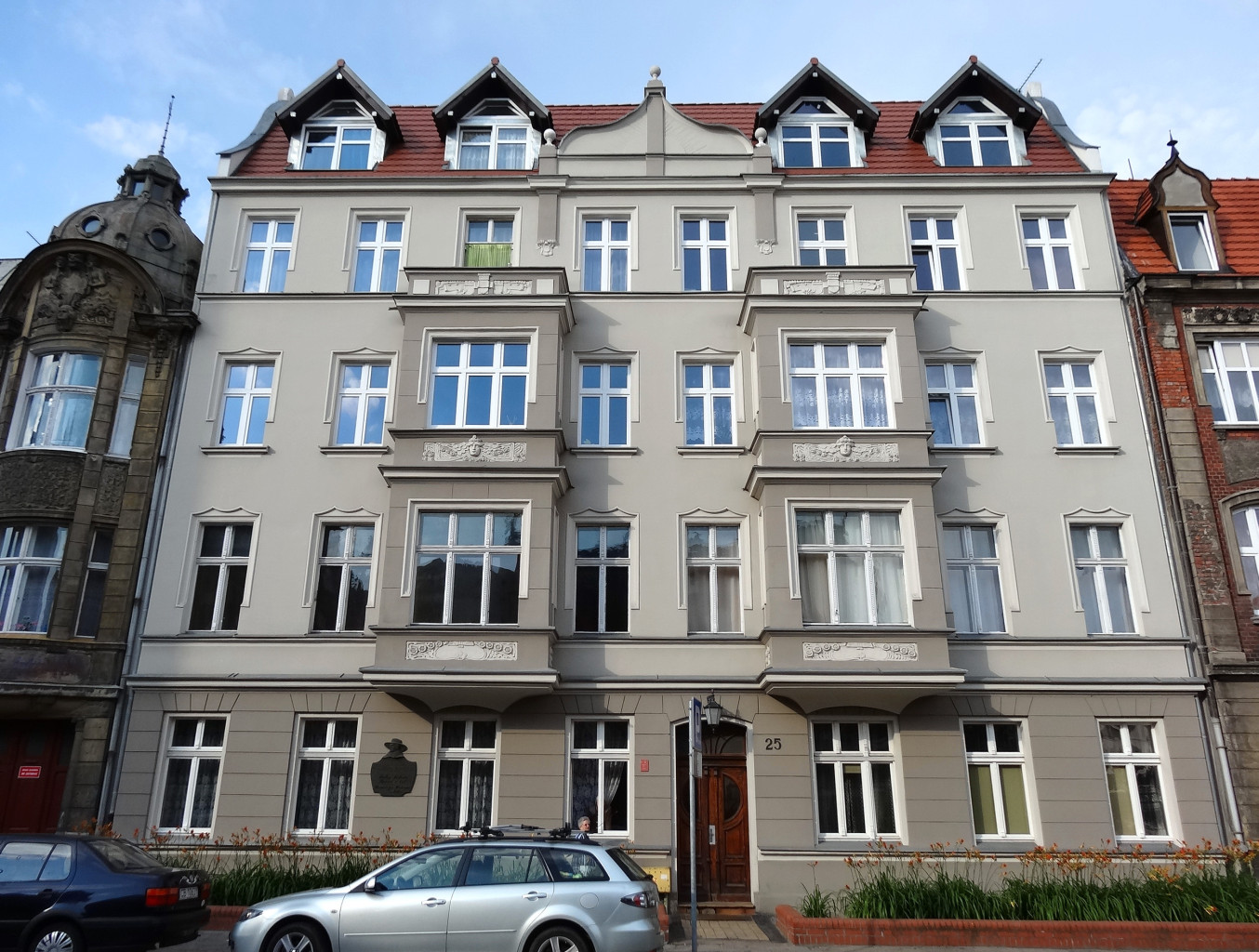
main elevation on the street

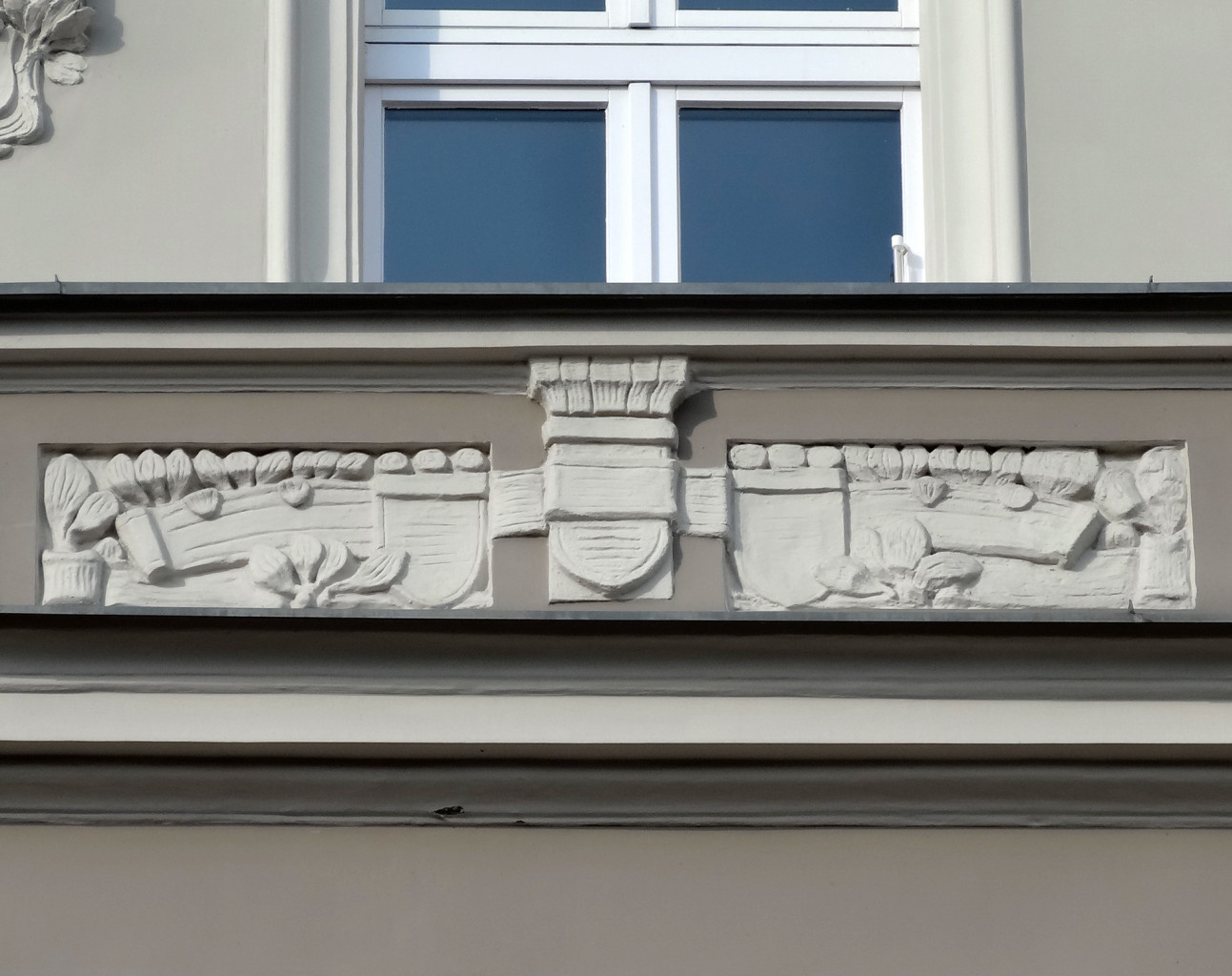
Cartouche detail

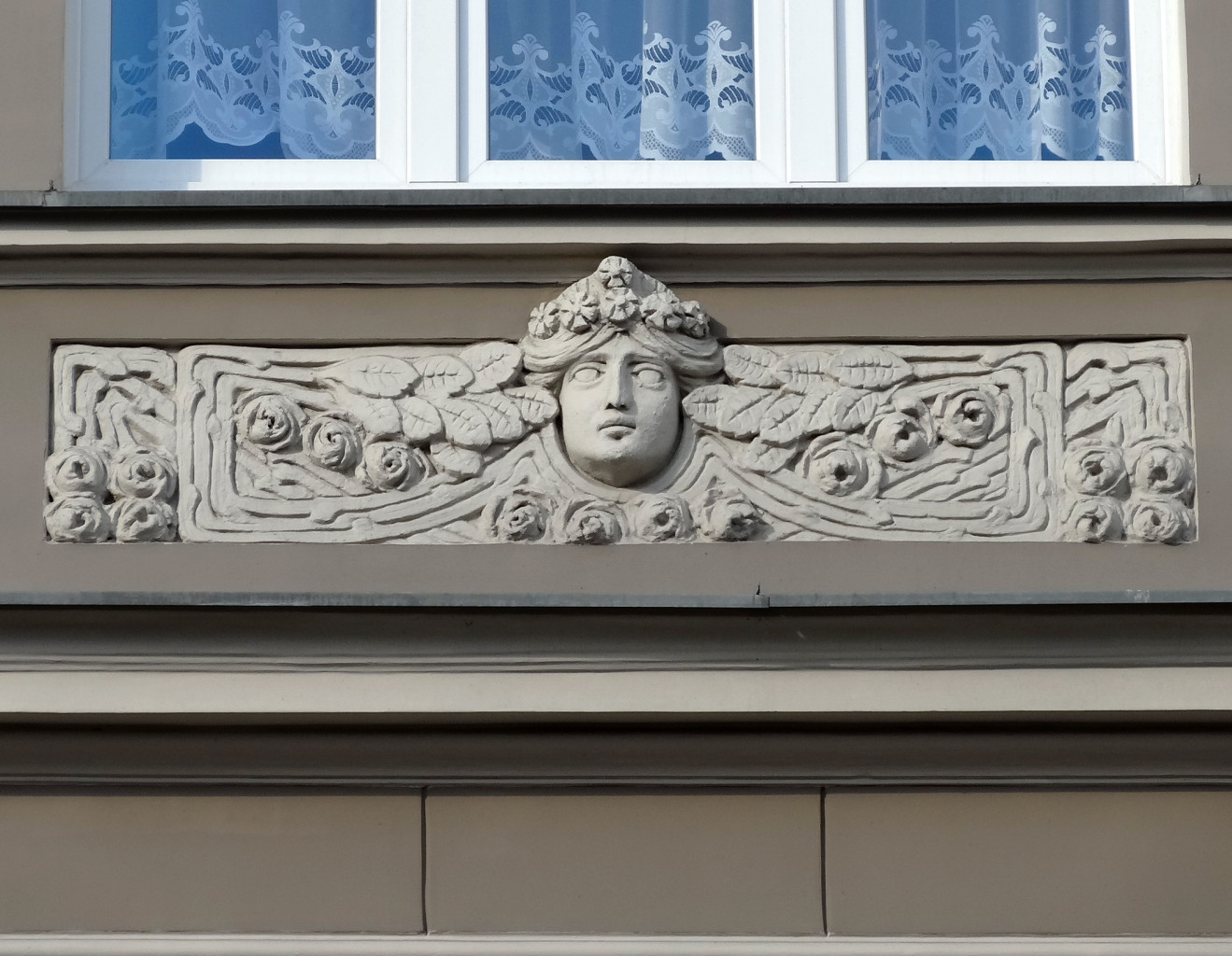
Cartouche detail

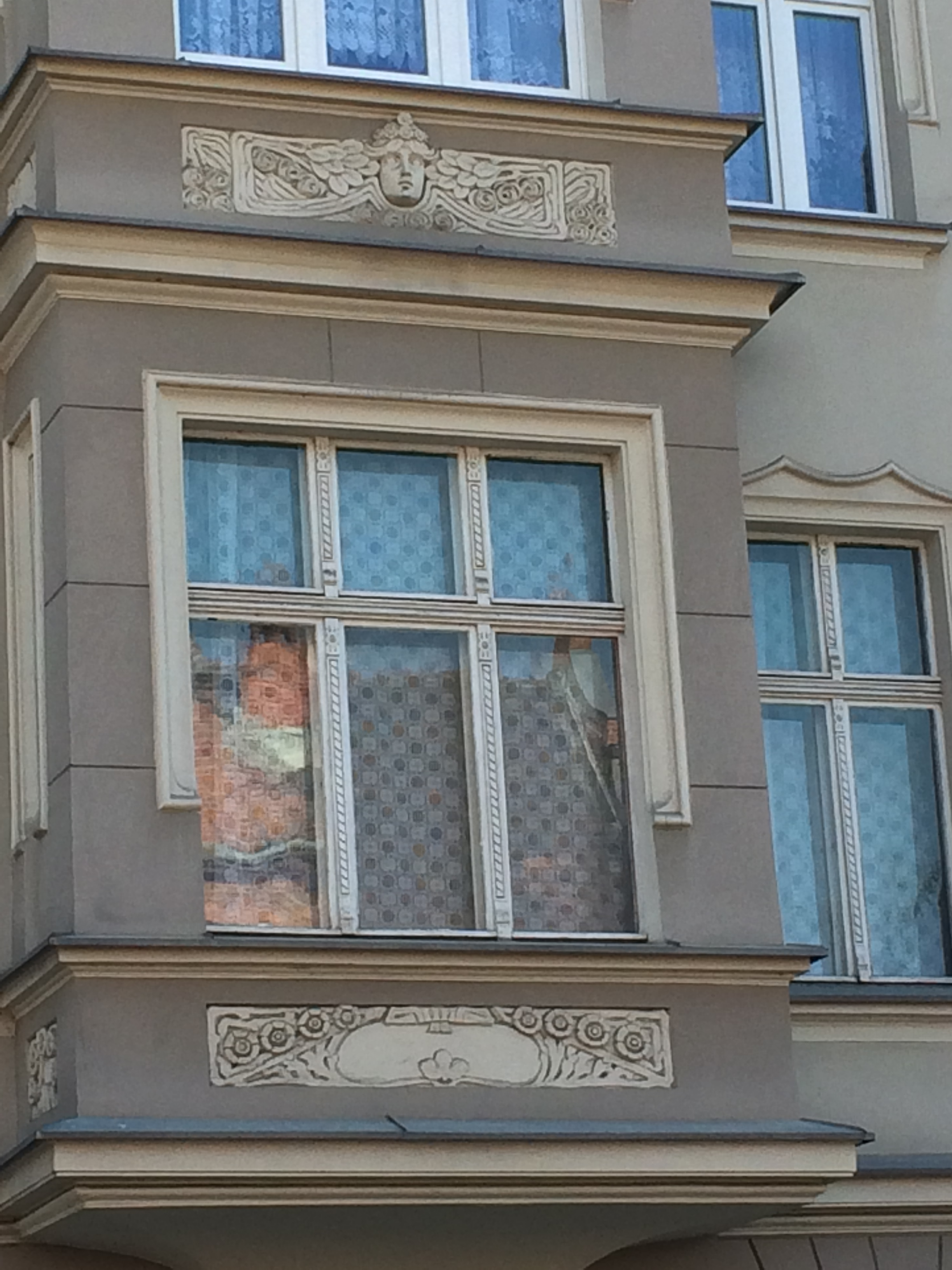
Bay window

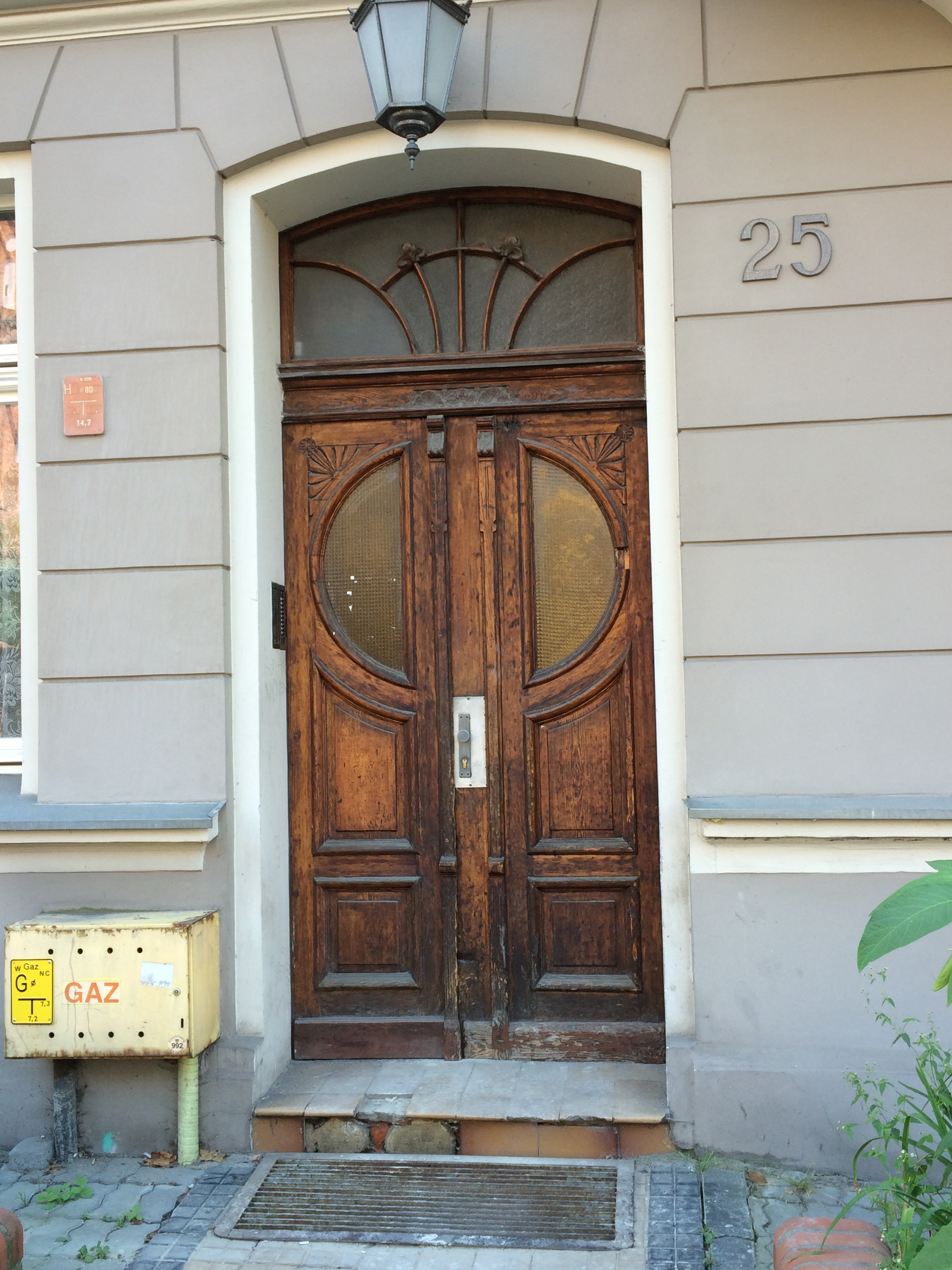
Entry gate

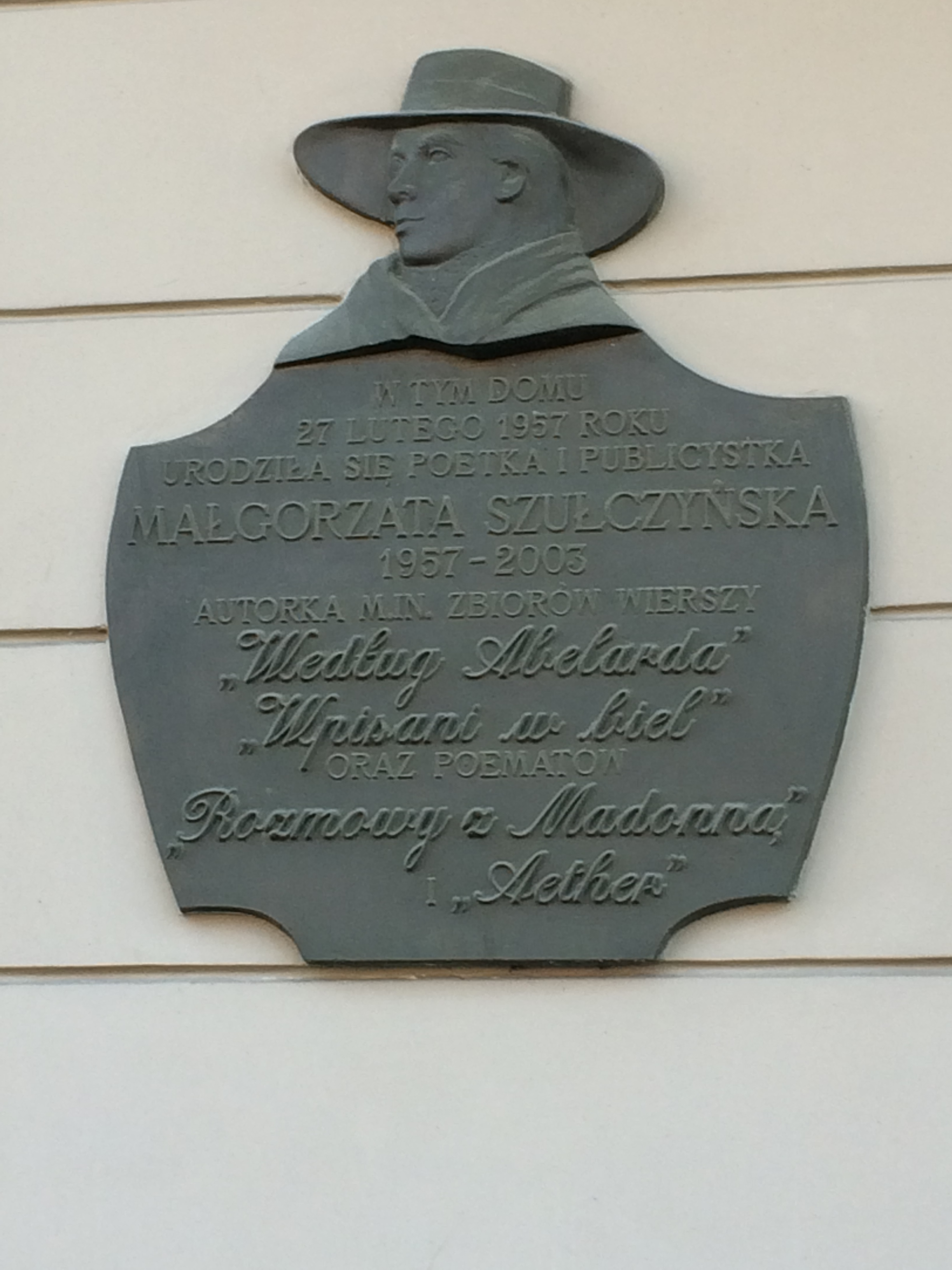
Plaque in memoriam of Malgorzata Szulczynska

=== Holy Trinity Church, at 26 ===
Registered on Kuyavian-Pomeranian Voivodeship Heritage List, Nr.601222 Reg.A/752, September 20, 1971

1912, by Roger Sławski

Modern architecture, Neo-Baroque (interiors)

The church was consecrated by Wilhelm Kloske, Gniezno's suffragan bishop on May 18, 1913. Initially, it was reserved for the use of Polish Catholics, while the Church of the Sacred Heart of Jesus, inaugurated in June 1913 was opened to the German community.

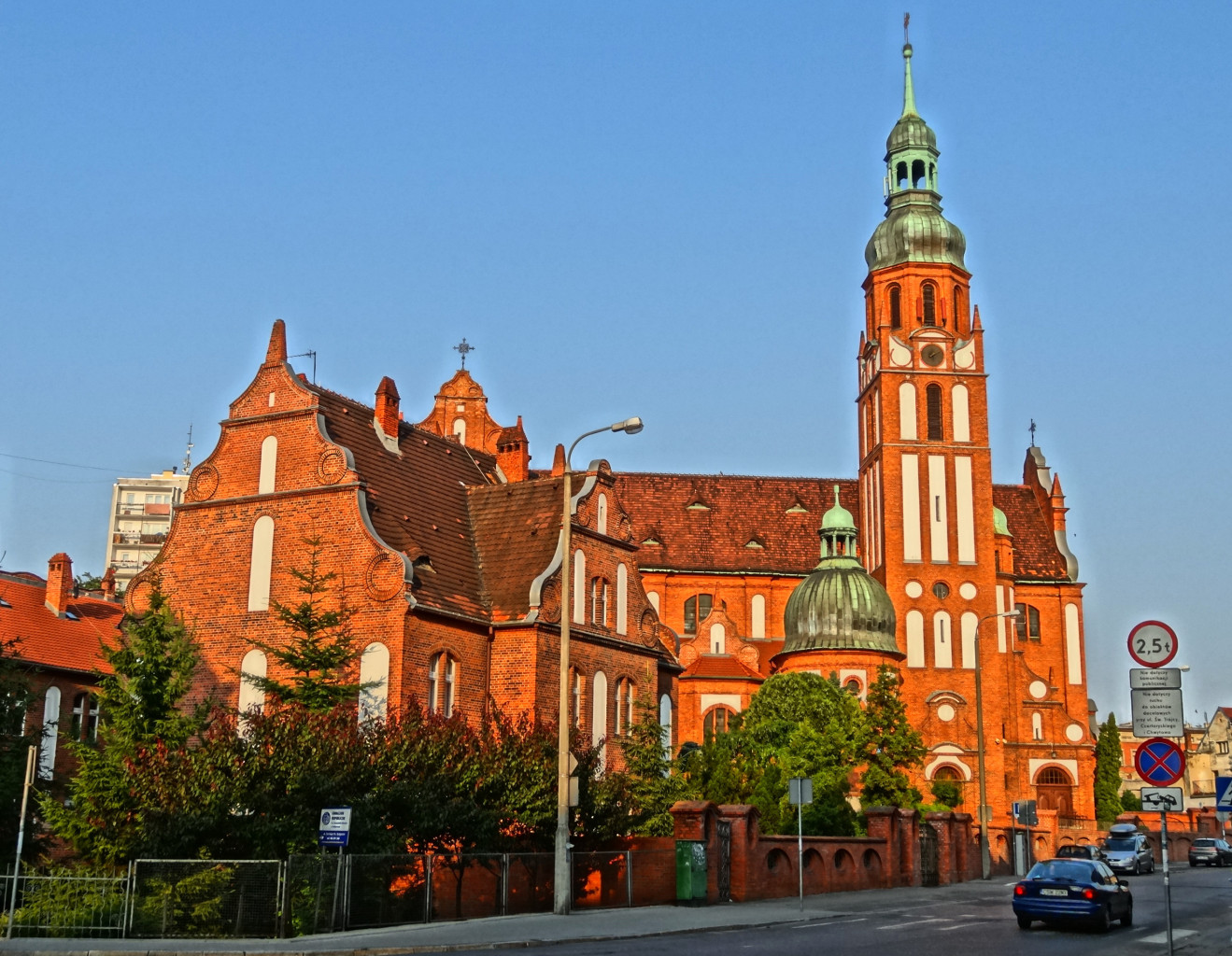
View of the building complex from the street

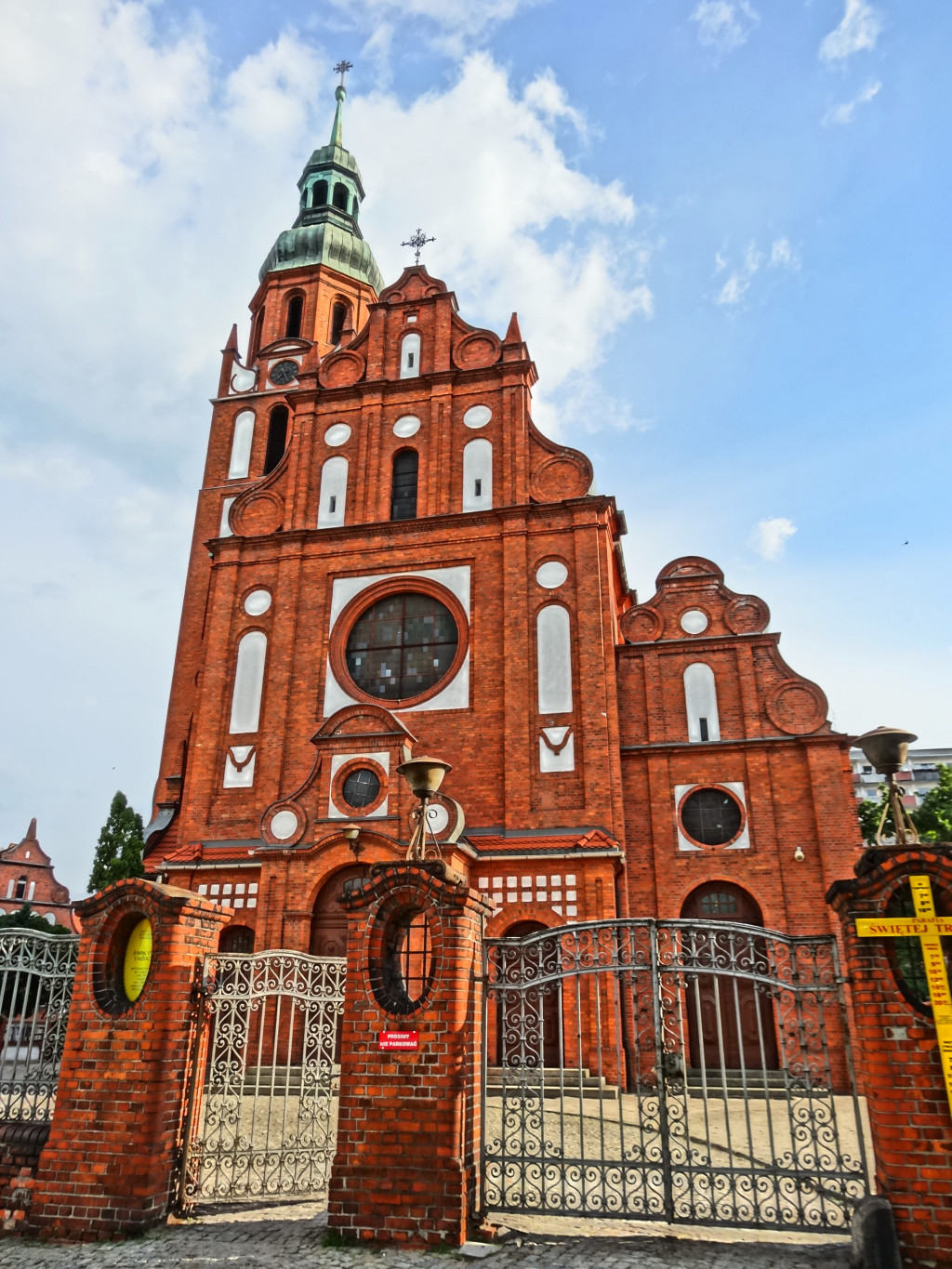
Main facade

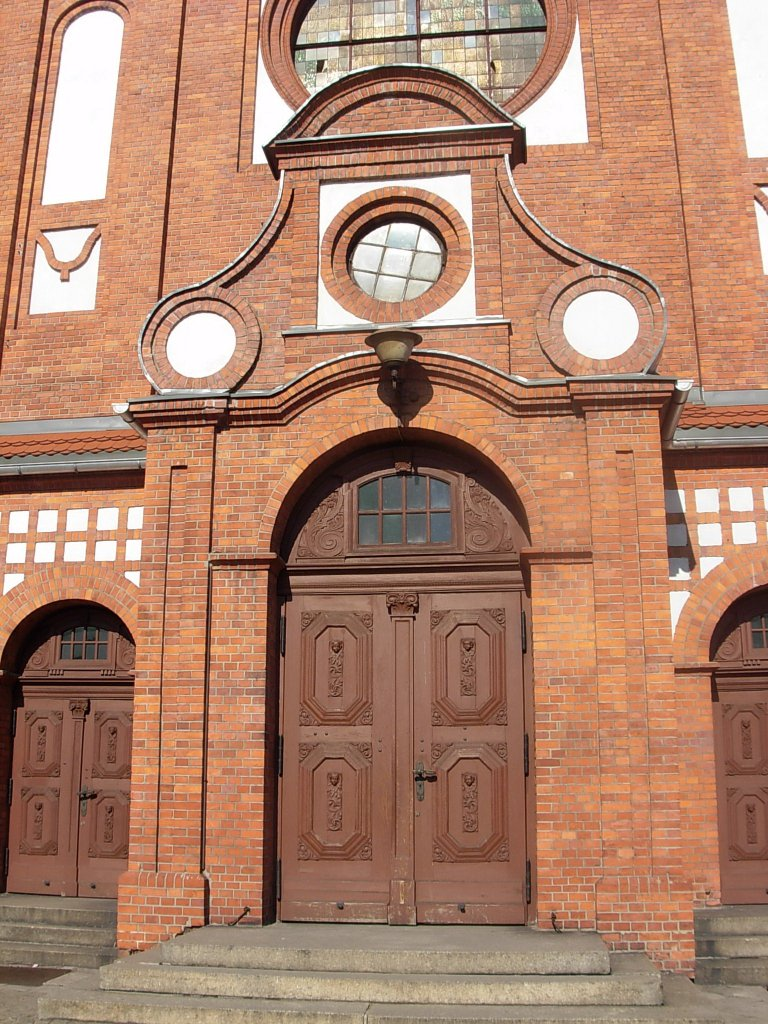
Church portal

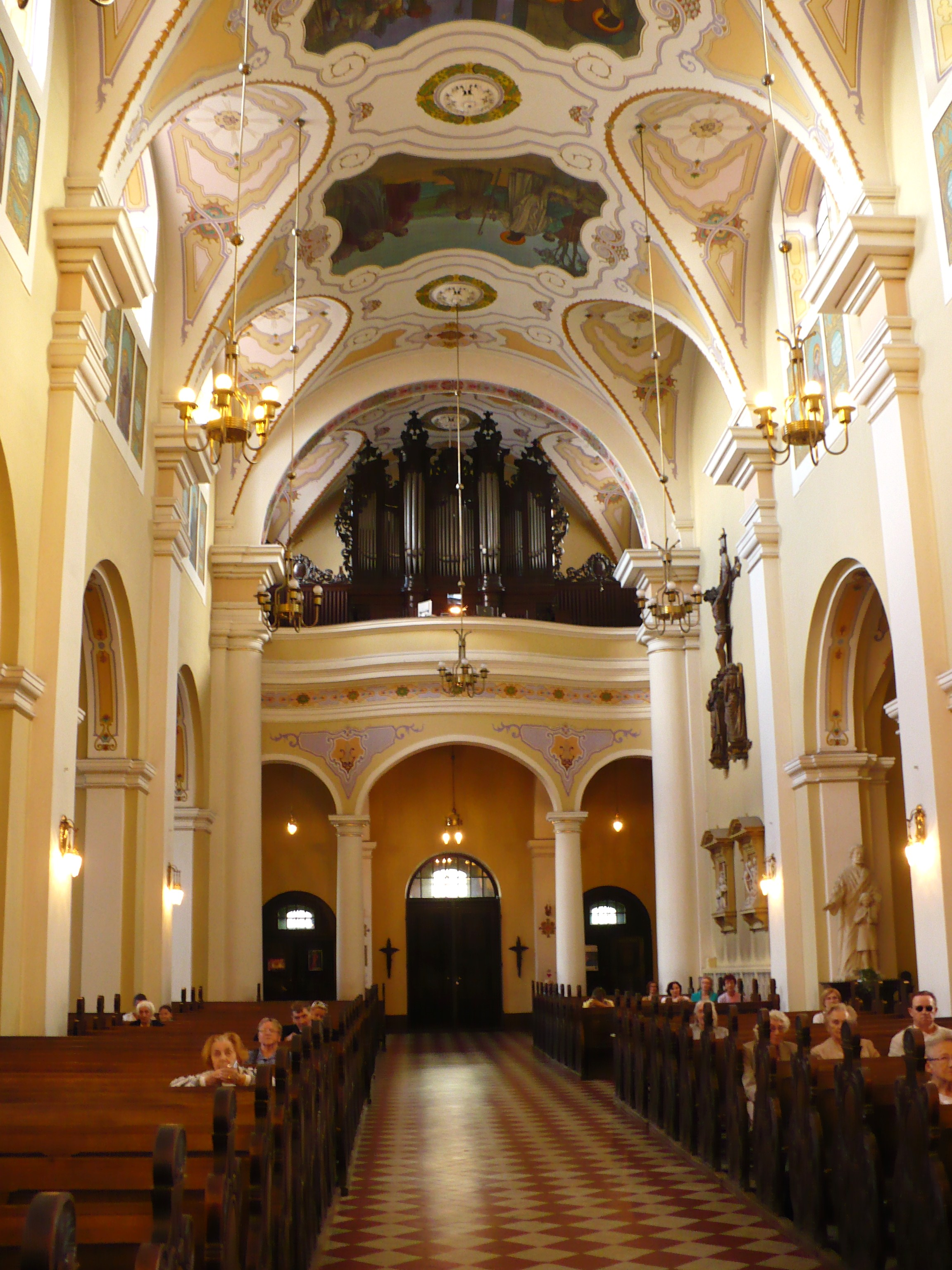
Church nave and organ

=== Tenement at 27, corner with 9 Kordeckiego street ===
1905

German Historicism

The house, initially at Berliner straße 6b, was owned by a smith, Anton Hertzke. It was bought in the early 1910s by Carl ßeilke, a factory manager, who lived nearby, at Hippelstraße 13 (today's Kordieckiego street 9). His widow lived there till 1926. The building will undergo a thorough overhaul end of 2016.

The tenement has two facades on the street. There are round top windows on the ground floor. The upper floors are all brick covered, with cartouches and long pilasters. The top wall dormers have ogee shapes. The corner of the building contains a thin bay window, much like a bartizan, crowned by an onion dome roof with a finial.

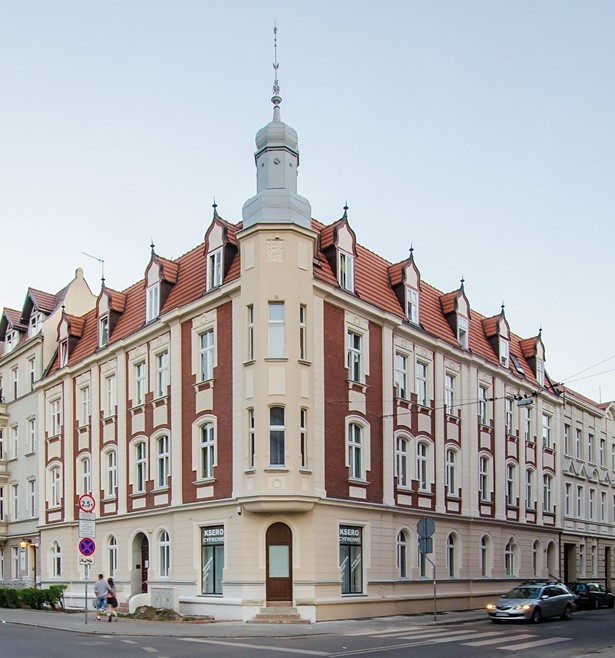
View from streets intersection

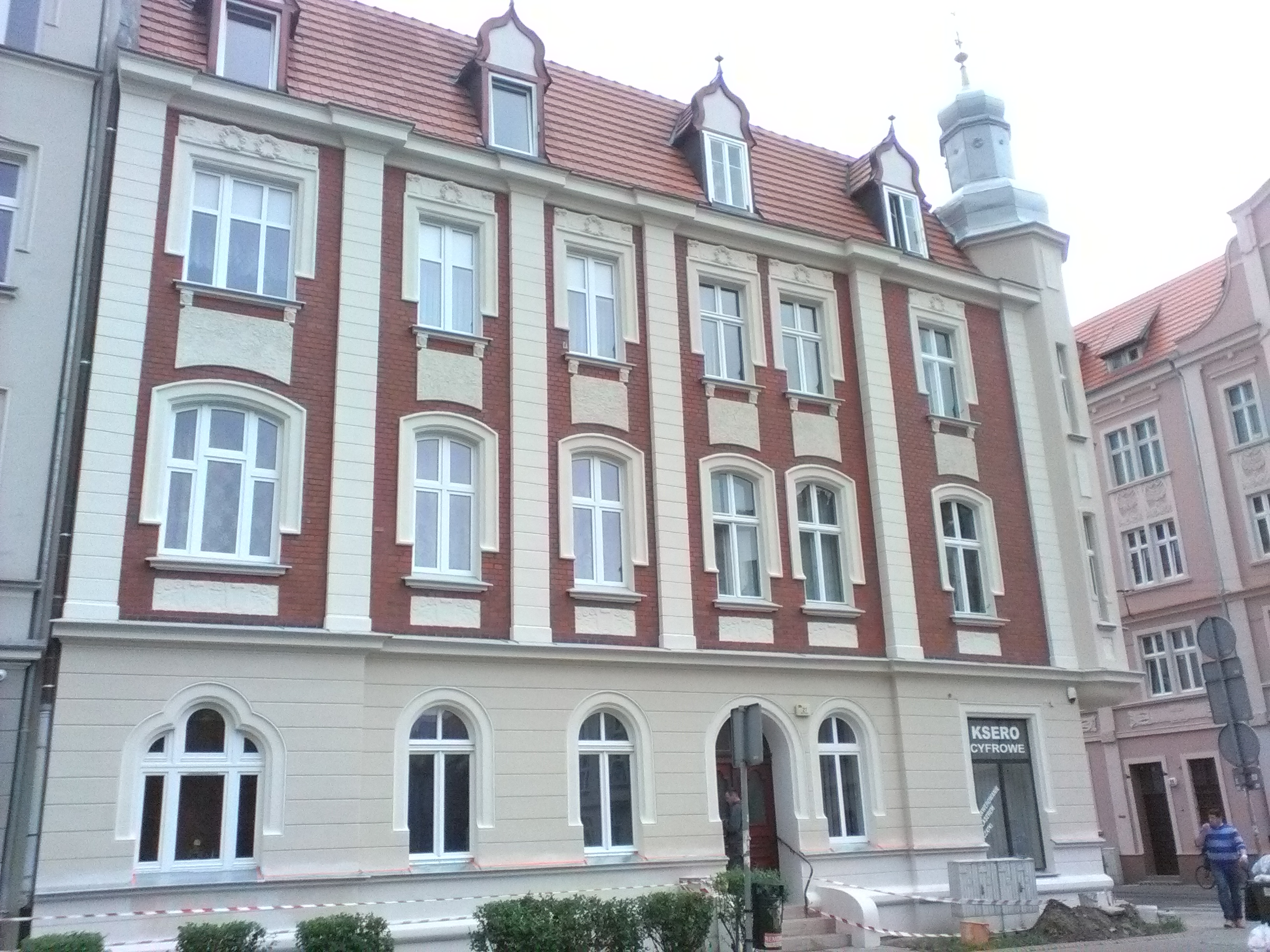
View of the corner from Swiętej Trojcy street

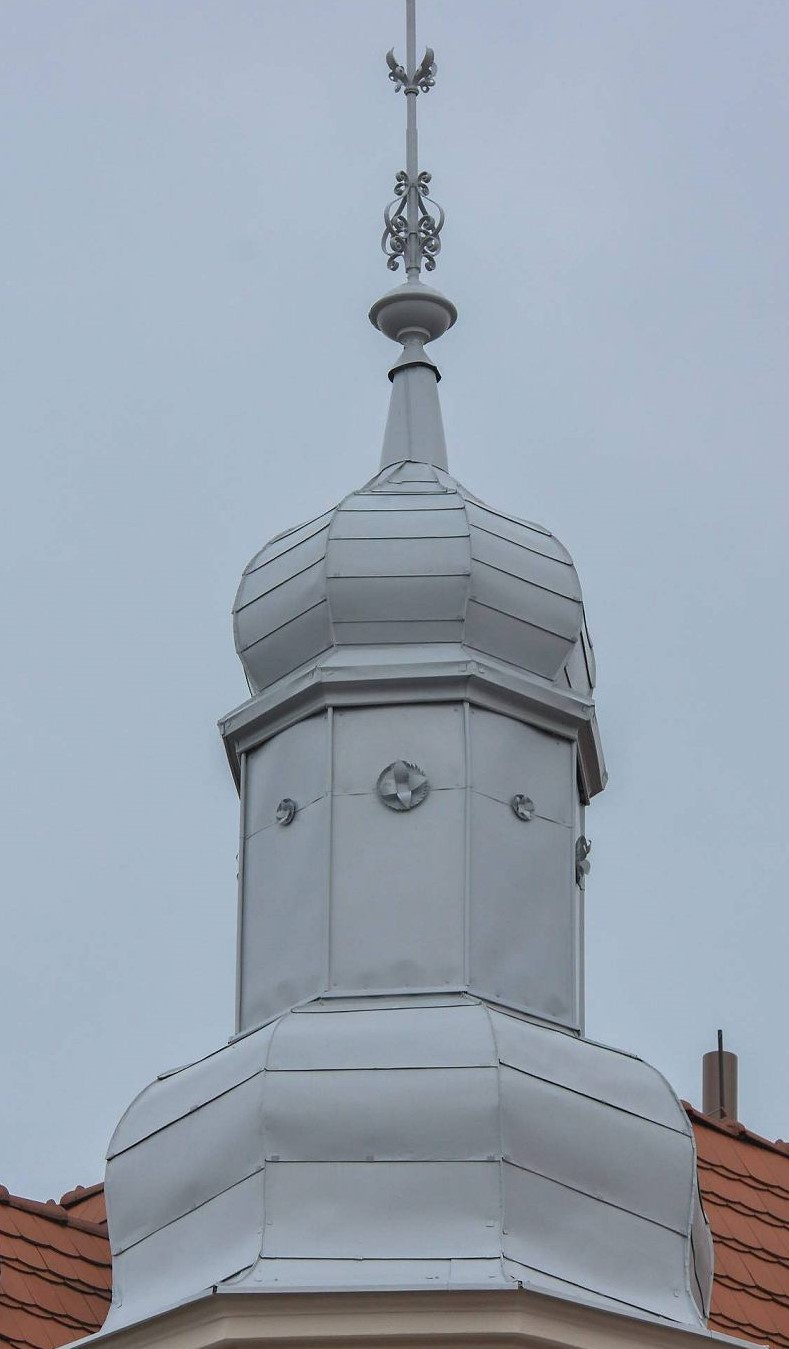
Onion dome and finial

=== Corner building with 12 Kordeckiego street ===
1898

Art Nouveau

The plot belonged to Johann Sikorski, a restaurateur who had the tenement erected at the end of the 19th century. Initially at Hippelstraße 1, the building has been the property of the same family till the end of the 1930s.

The tenement has several Art Nouveau details, especially cartouches, pediments and friezes. The facade on Kordieckiego street is the most adorned, the other one having lost its decoration. Both elevation have bay windows with a balcony and are topped with an ogee shaped wall dormer.

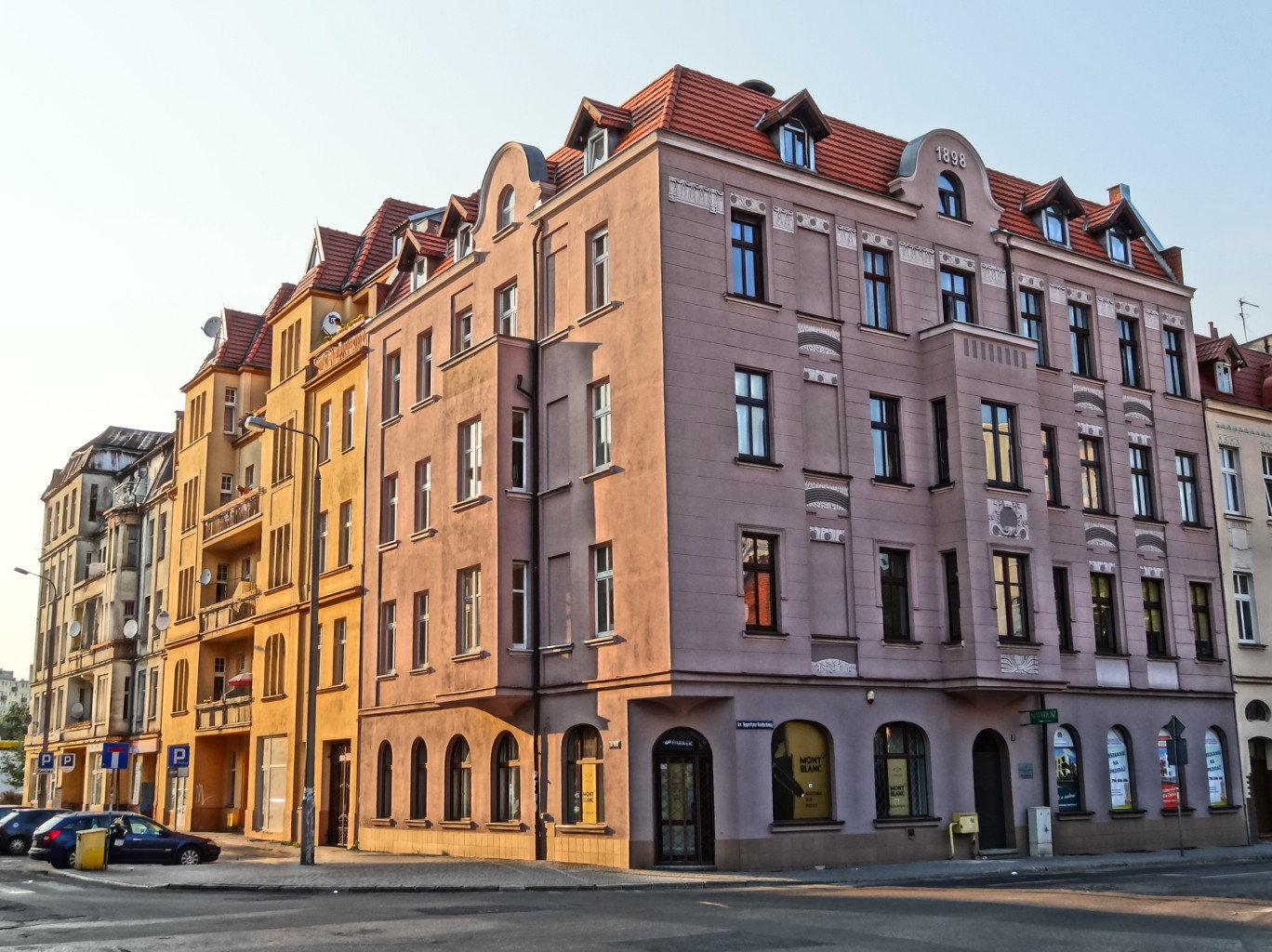
View from streets intersection

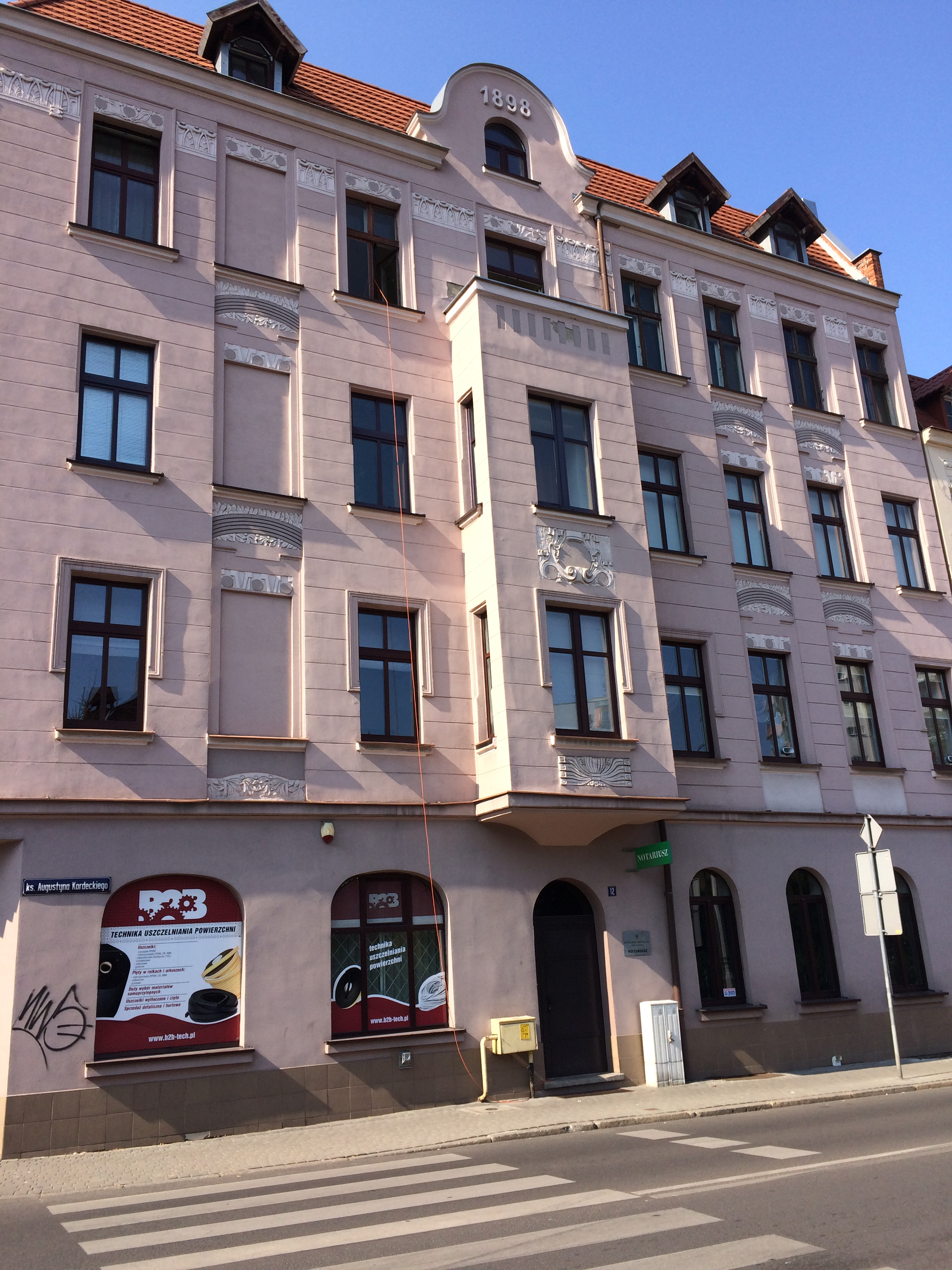
Facade on Kordeckiego street

=== Tenement at 28 ===
1910, by Zemisch

Late Art Nouveau, Modern architecture

The house, initially at Berliner straße 22b, was owned by Mr Busse, a member of the city council. His widow Ella lived there till 1920. Until 1939, Tadeusz Nowakowski, a writer and journalist (1917–1996) lived there with his parents coming from Olsztyn.

The tenement features a mix of styles: late Art Nouveau (adorned Portal, wrought iron gate, eyelid dormer) and early Modern architecture (straight lines, symmetry in the opening's locations).

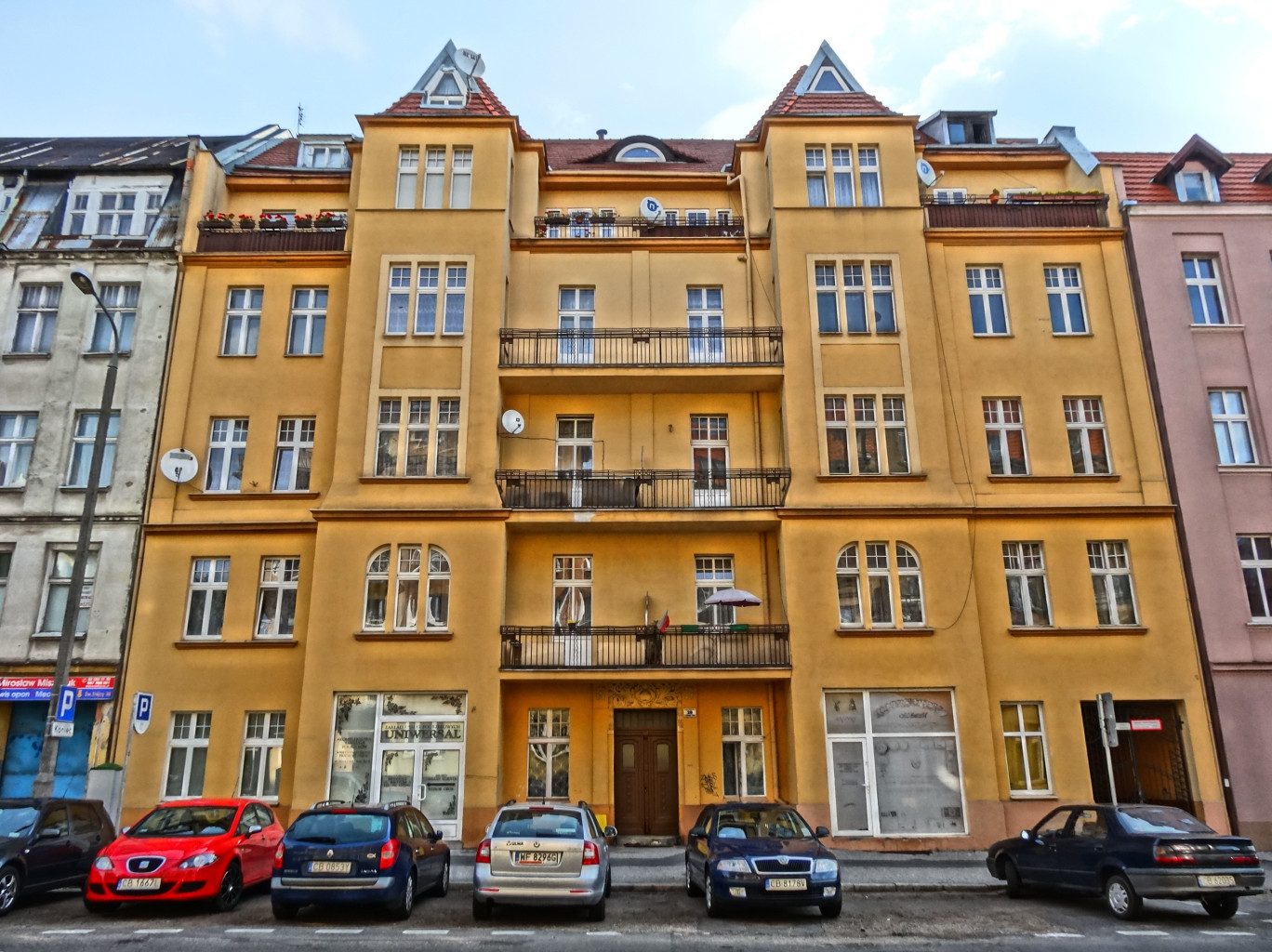
Main elevation from the street

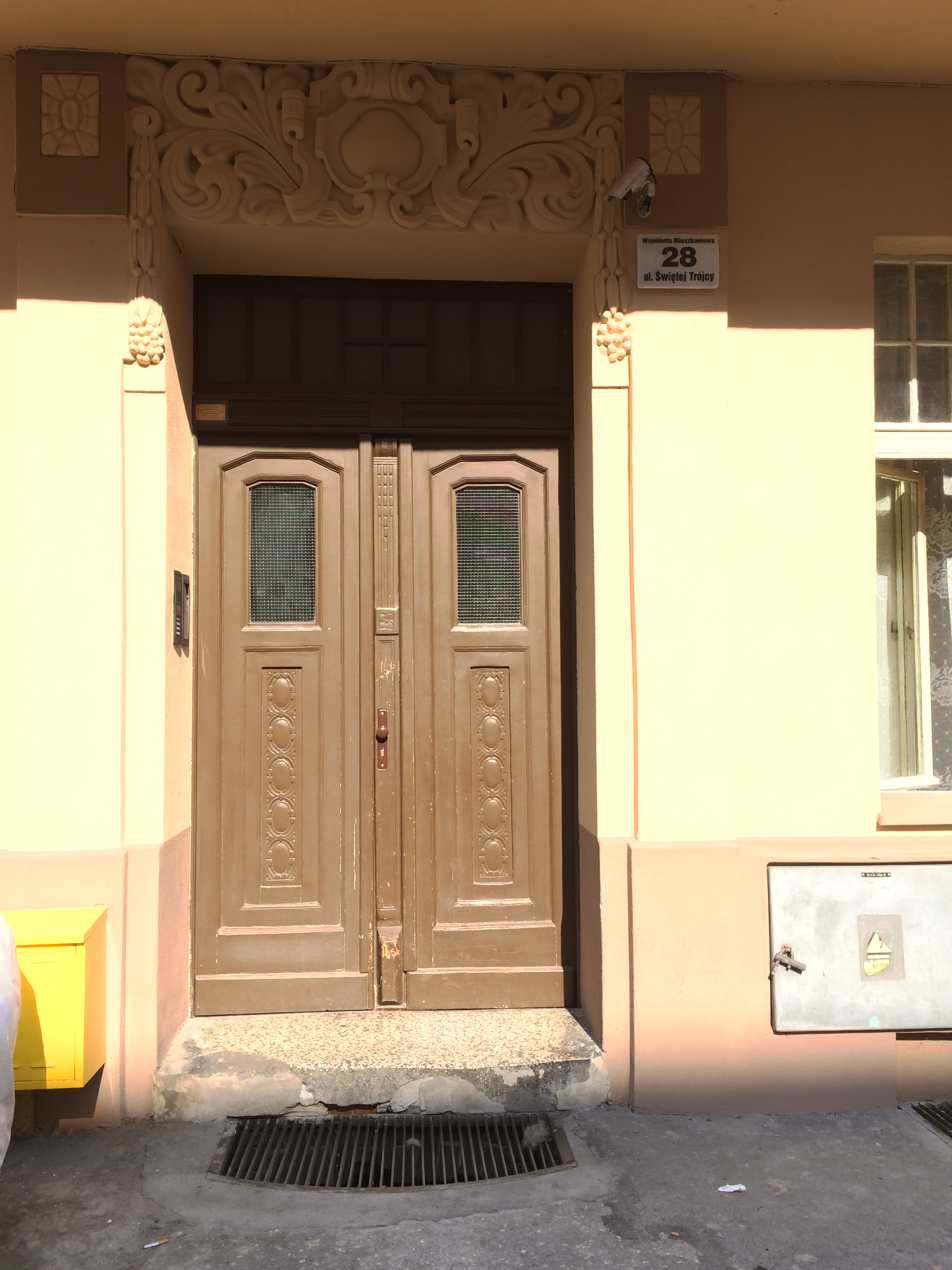
Portal

=== Tenement at 29, corner with 14 Kordeckiego street ===
Registered on Kuyavian-Pomeranian Voivodeship Heritage List, Nr.722476 Reg A/1389, October 6, 2008

1910

Art Nouveau

The house, initially at Berliner straße 7, was co-owned by Heinrich Kori, a Berlin engineer, and the widow of Rudolph Kori, a lawyer in Leipzig. In 1910, the building moved to the hands of Wedell brothers, Carl (a geometer) and Paul (a merchant): it remained in the Wedell family until the outbreak of World War II.

The tenement has two facades of magnificent Art Nouveau architectural style, recently renovated in 2016. A corner bay window overhangs the entrance, ornamented with stuccos depicting two blooming trees. On both facades, a multitude of adorned motifs recall the late Secession style, echoing the Grawunder brothers' tenements erected at Dworcowa Street 45/47 during the same period.

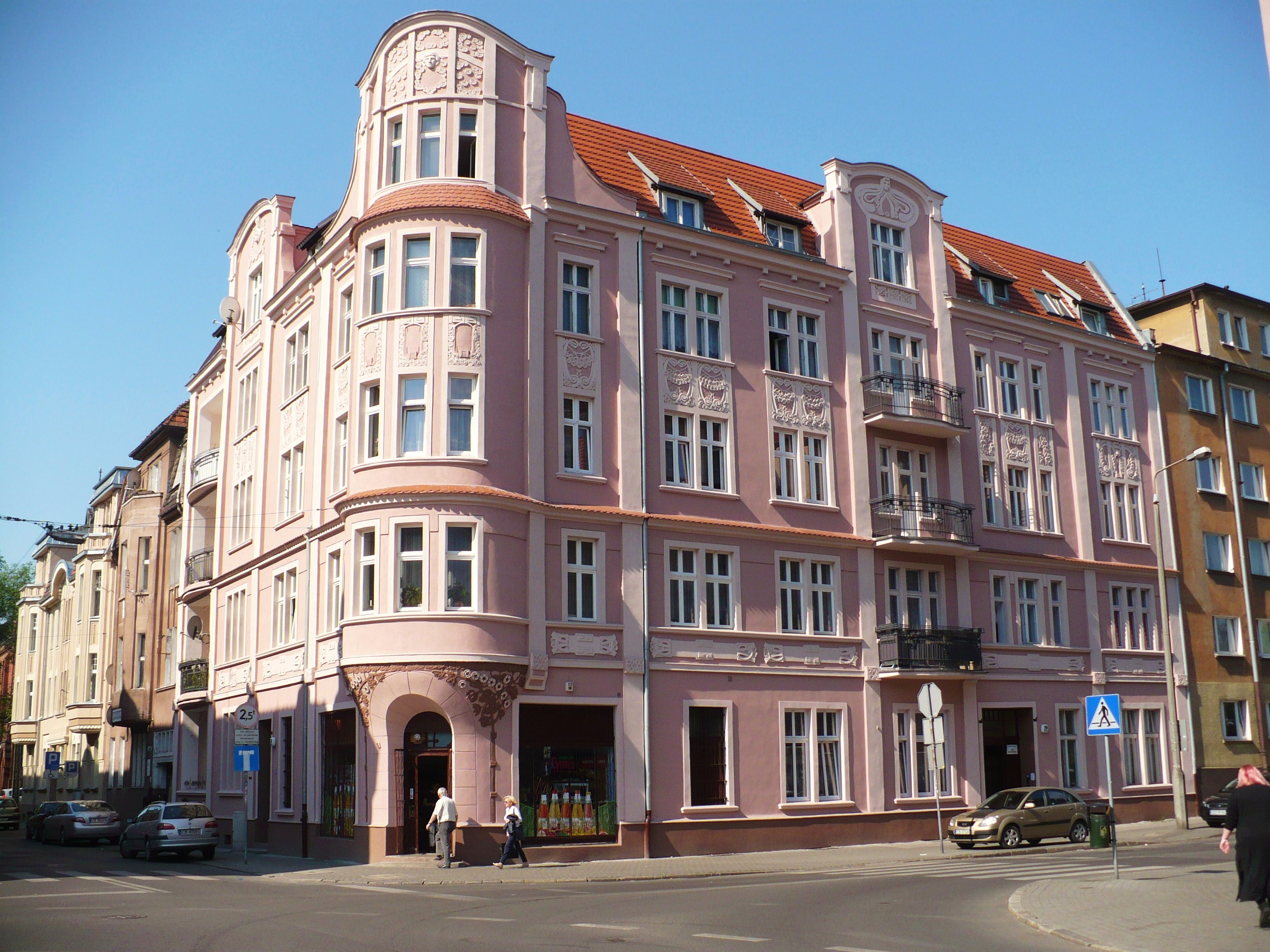
View from streets intersection

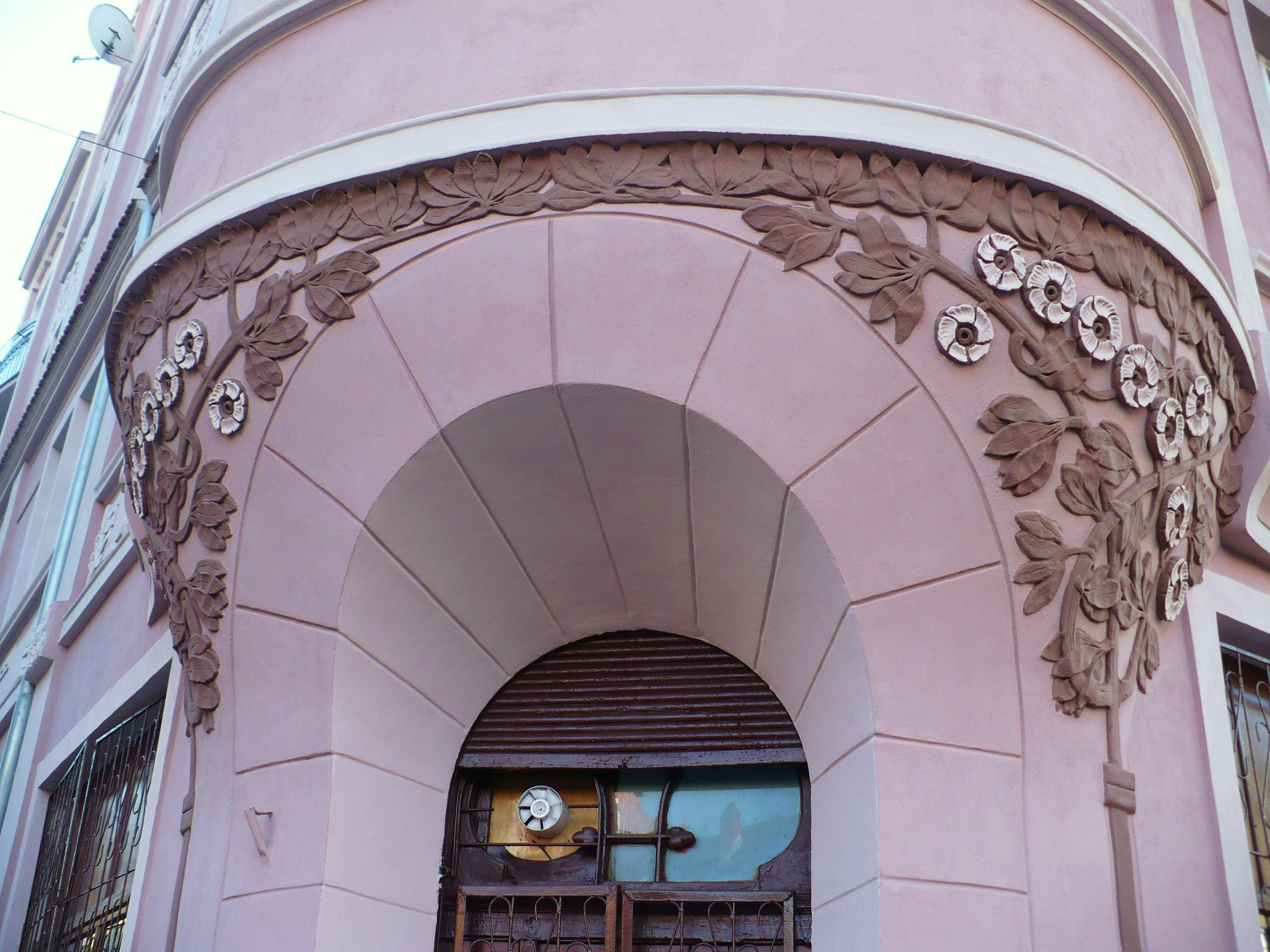
Decoration detail

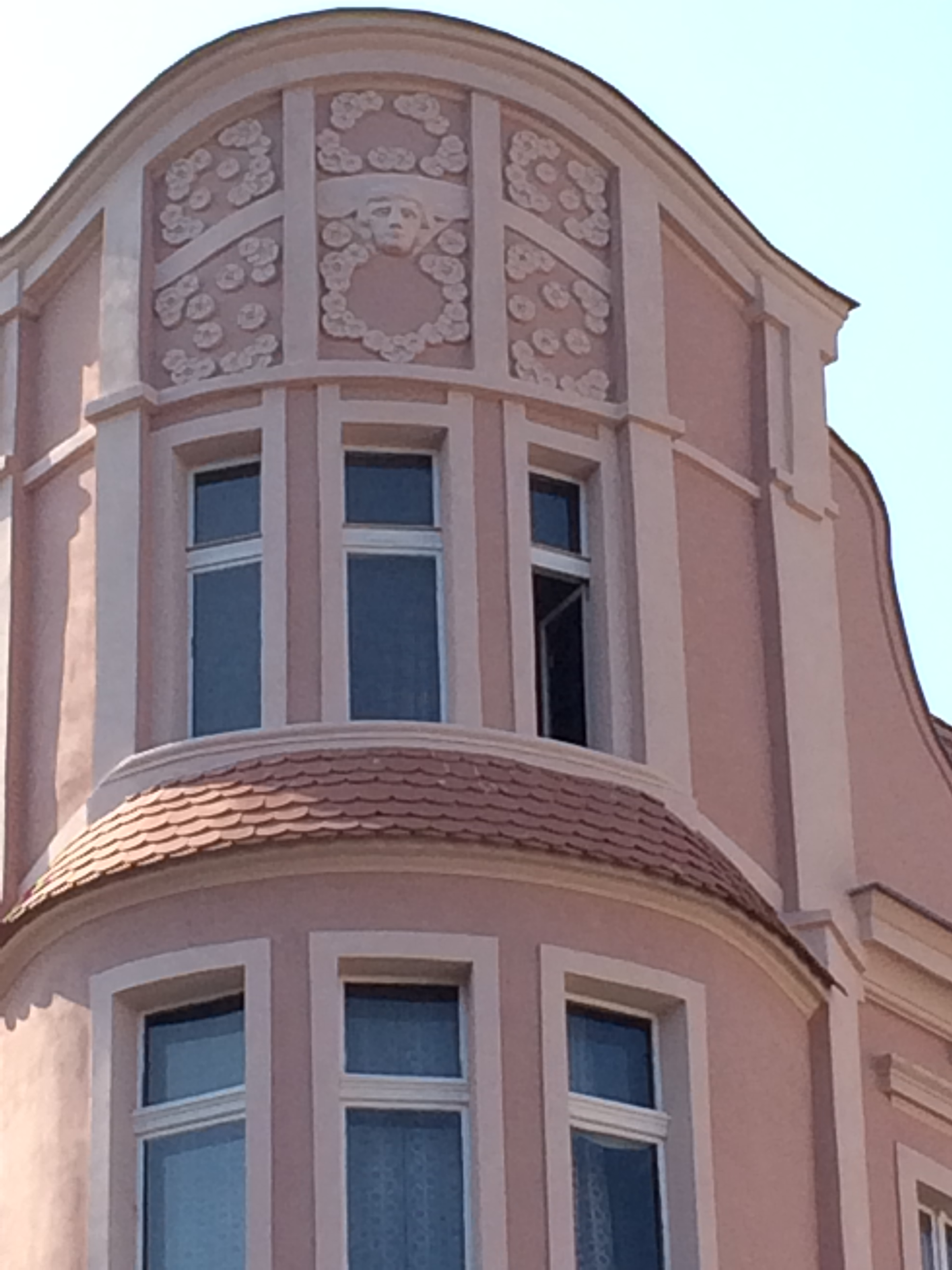
Gable motifs

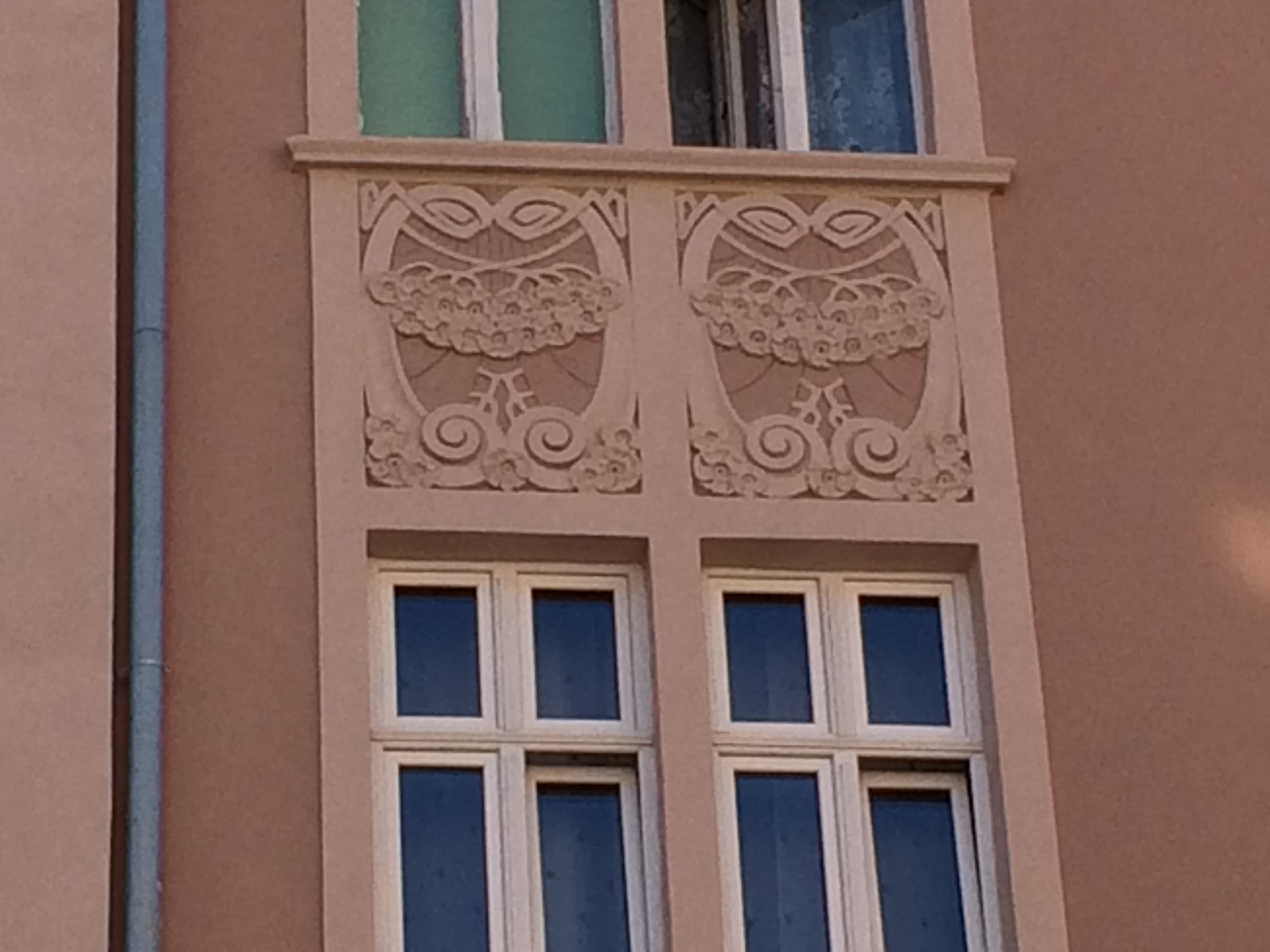
Cartouche

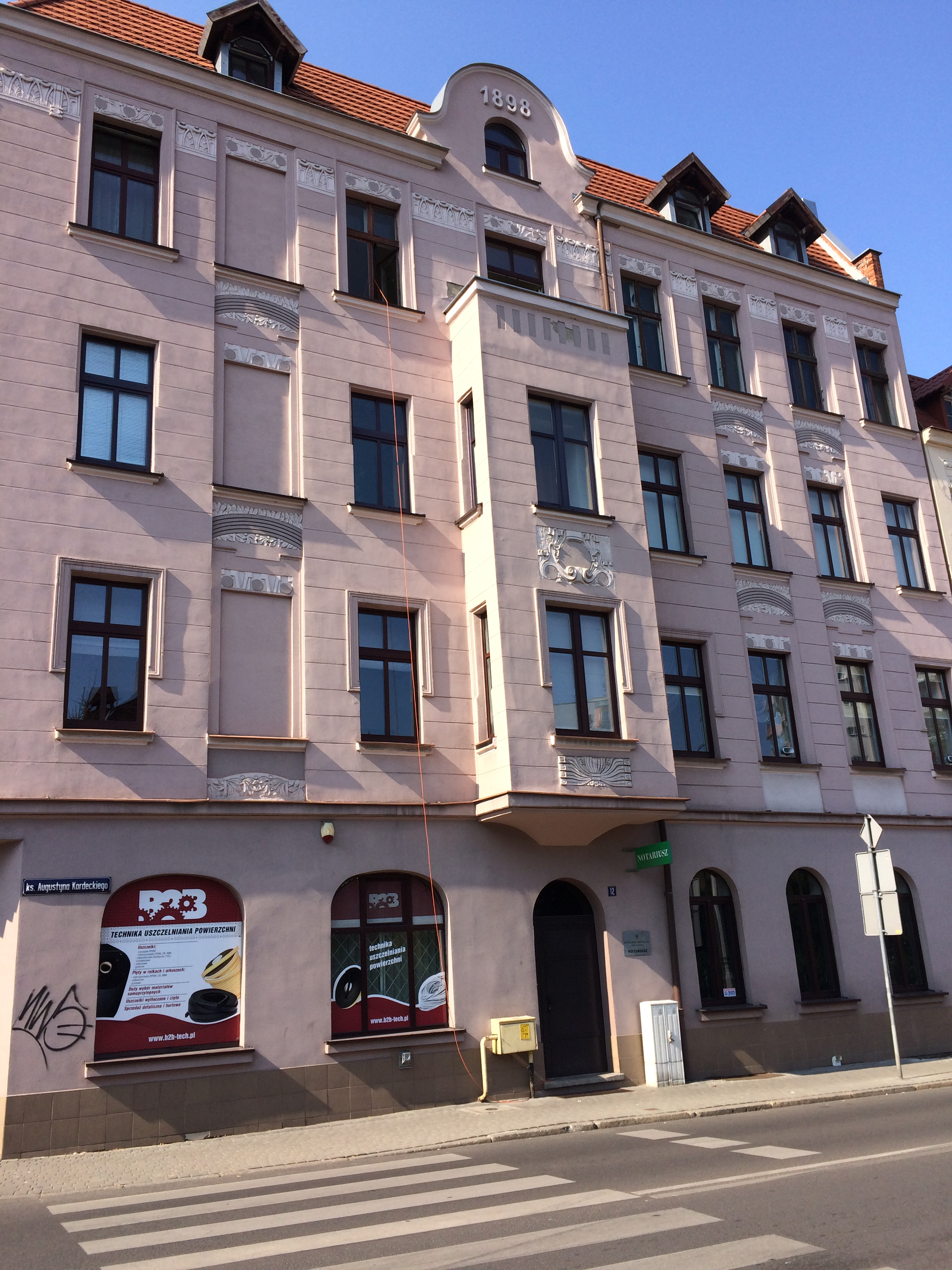
Elevation on Kordeckiego

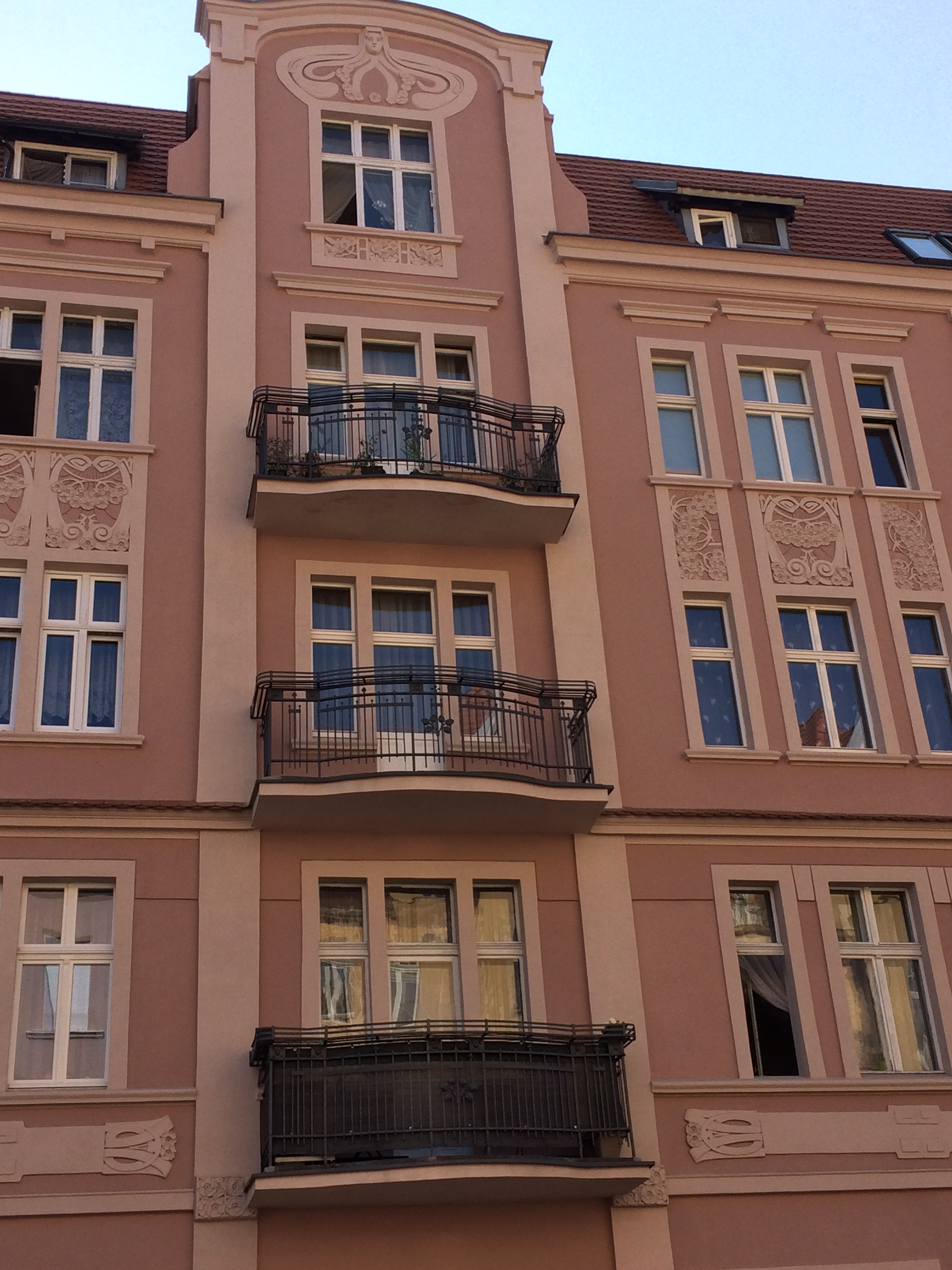
Elevation on Świętej Trojcy street

=== Tenement at 30 ===
Registered on the Kuyavian-Pomeranian Voivodeship Heritage List, Nr.601423 Reg.A/1075 (October 27, 1994)

1911–1912, by Zemisch

Early modernism

The house, initially at Berliner straße 22a, was owned by Artur Zemisch, who ran a construction company and lived at Hippelstraße 2 (now 8 Kordieckiego). In the 1920s, new owners Józef Toksiński and Jan Wilczewski had the tenement renovated.

The tenement features an adorned portal, loggias, balconies and a terrace. It was renovated in 2016.

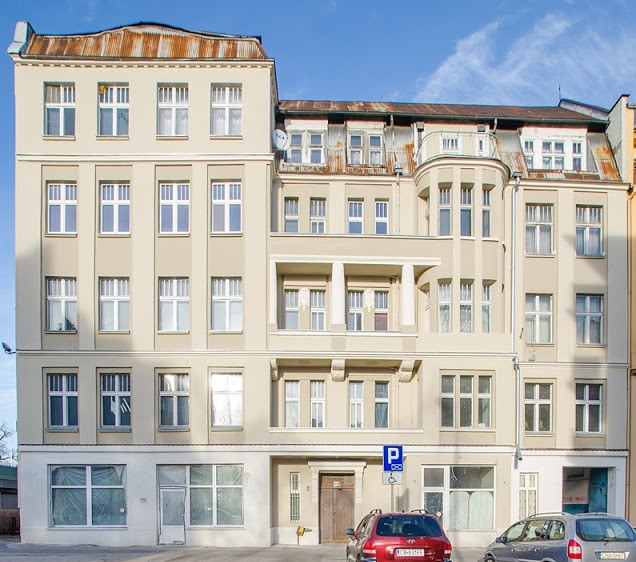
Main elevation from the street

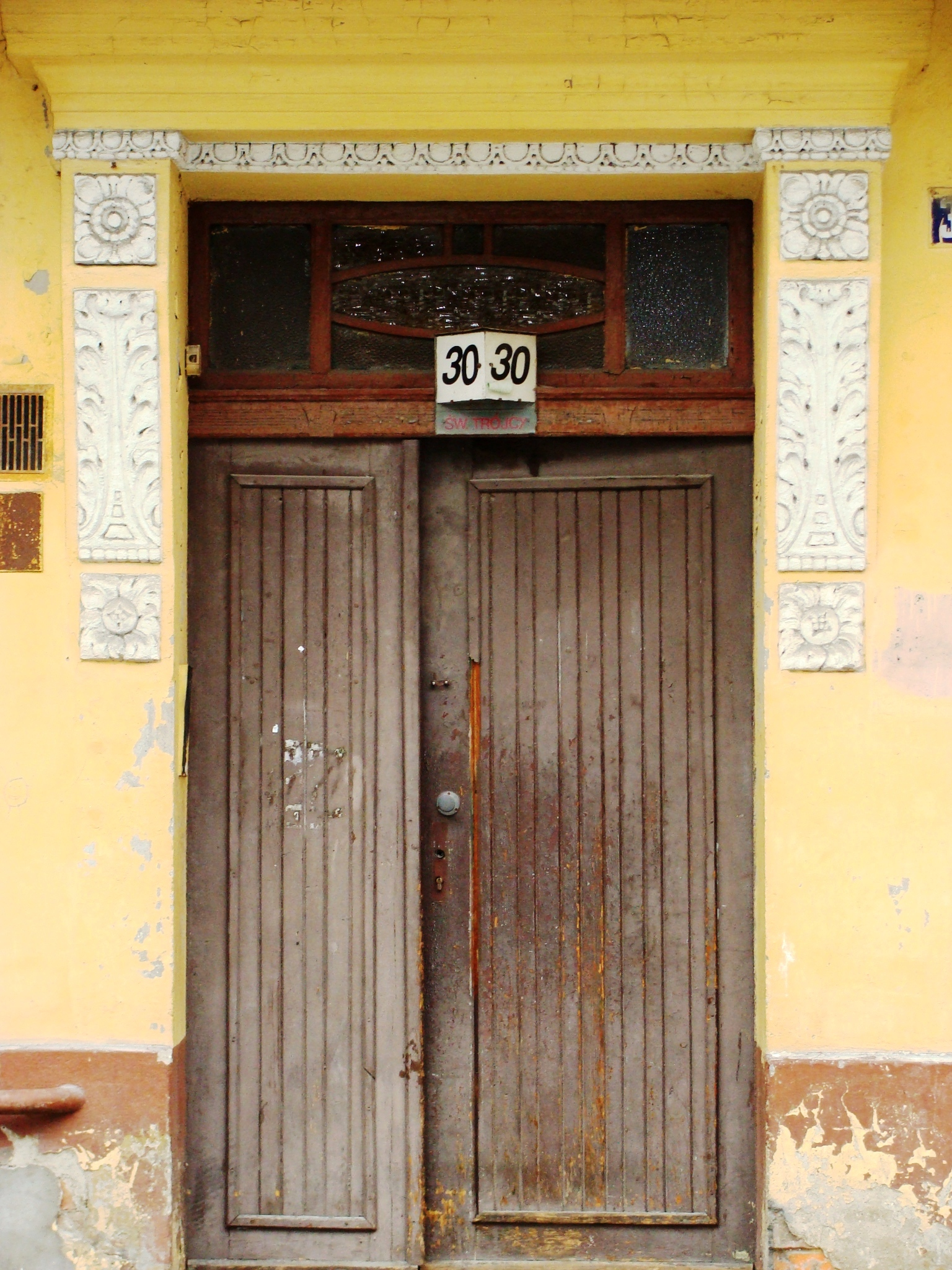
Portal

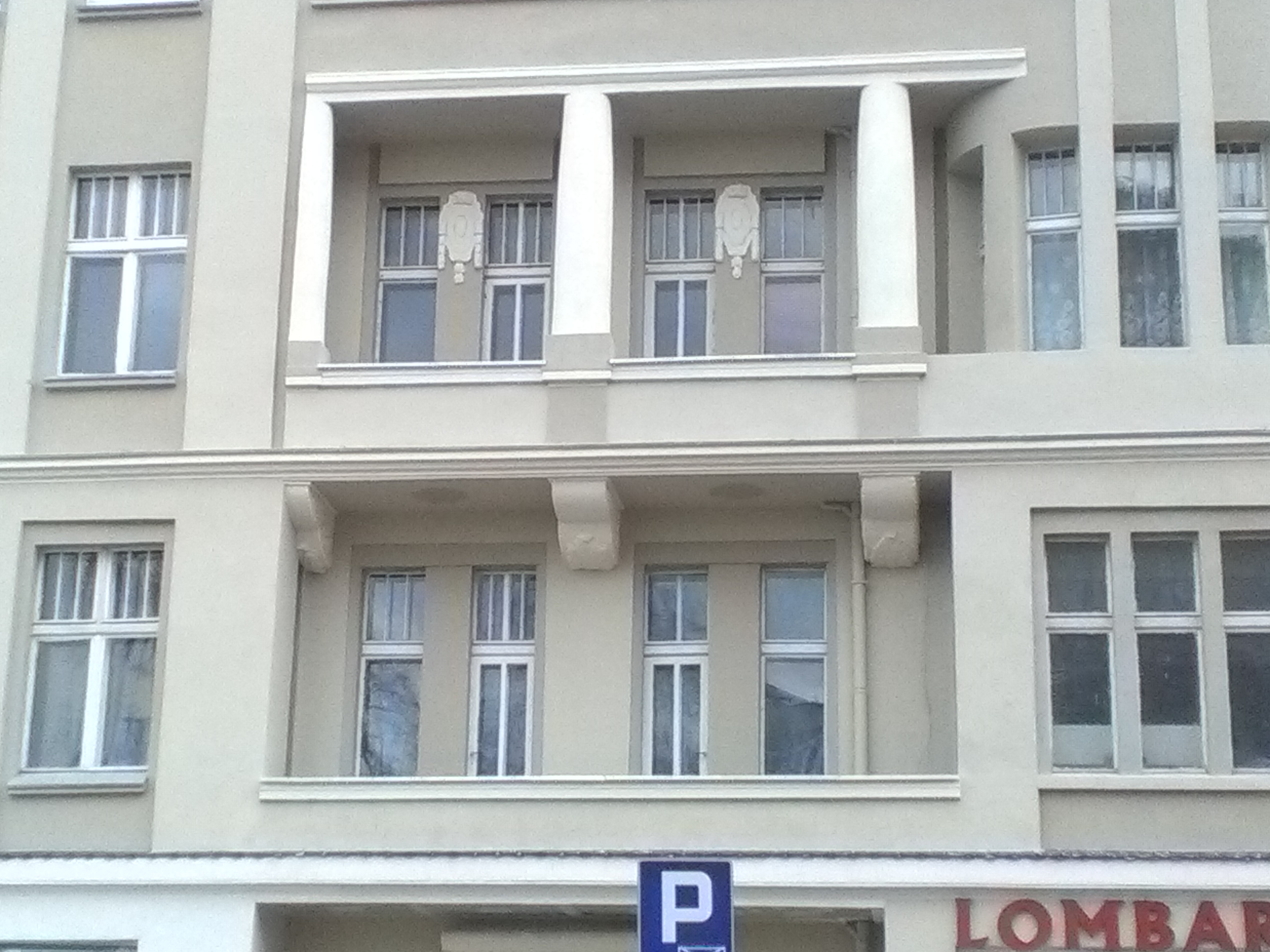
View of the loggia

=== Tenement at 35 ===
1912–1913, by Theodore Patzwald

Late Art Nouveau and Neo-Baroque

The house, initially at Berliner straße 10, was owned by Emil and Erich ßohl, who ran there a shop, ßohl & Son, selling soft drinks and cigars. Today, the building houses the Regional Chamber of Audit (RIO for Polish: Regionalna Izba Obrachunkowa).

Theodore Patzwald designed there one of the more stately Neo-Baroque houses of the city. The tenement displays noticeable architectural details, from bay windows topped by terrace, to wrought iron and balustrade balconies, to a huge round shape gable crowning the frontage.

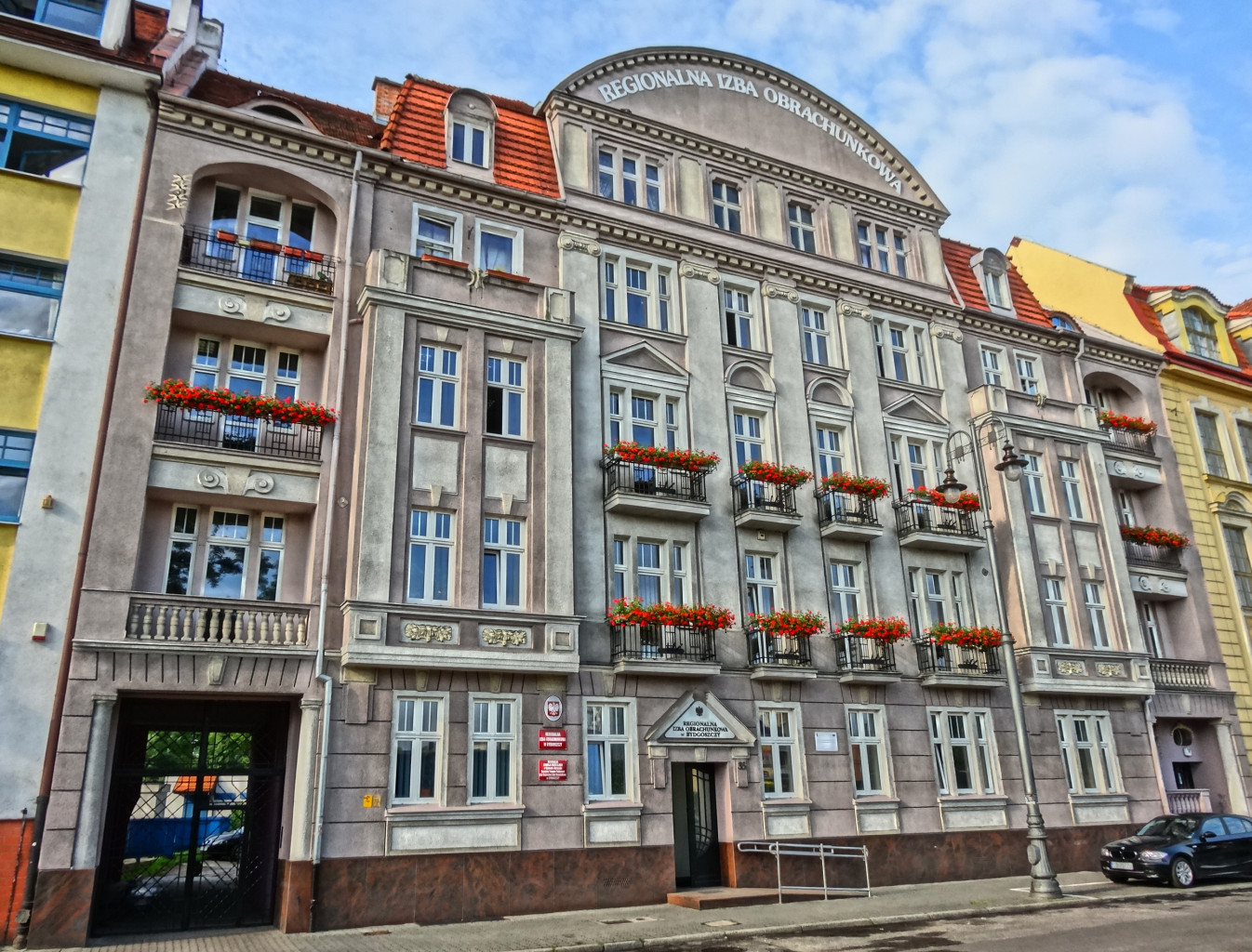
Main elevation from the street

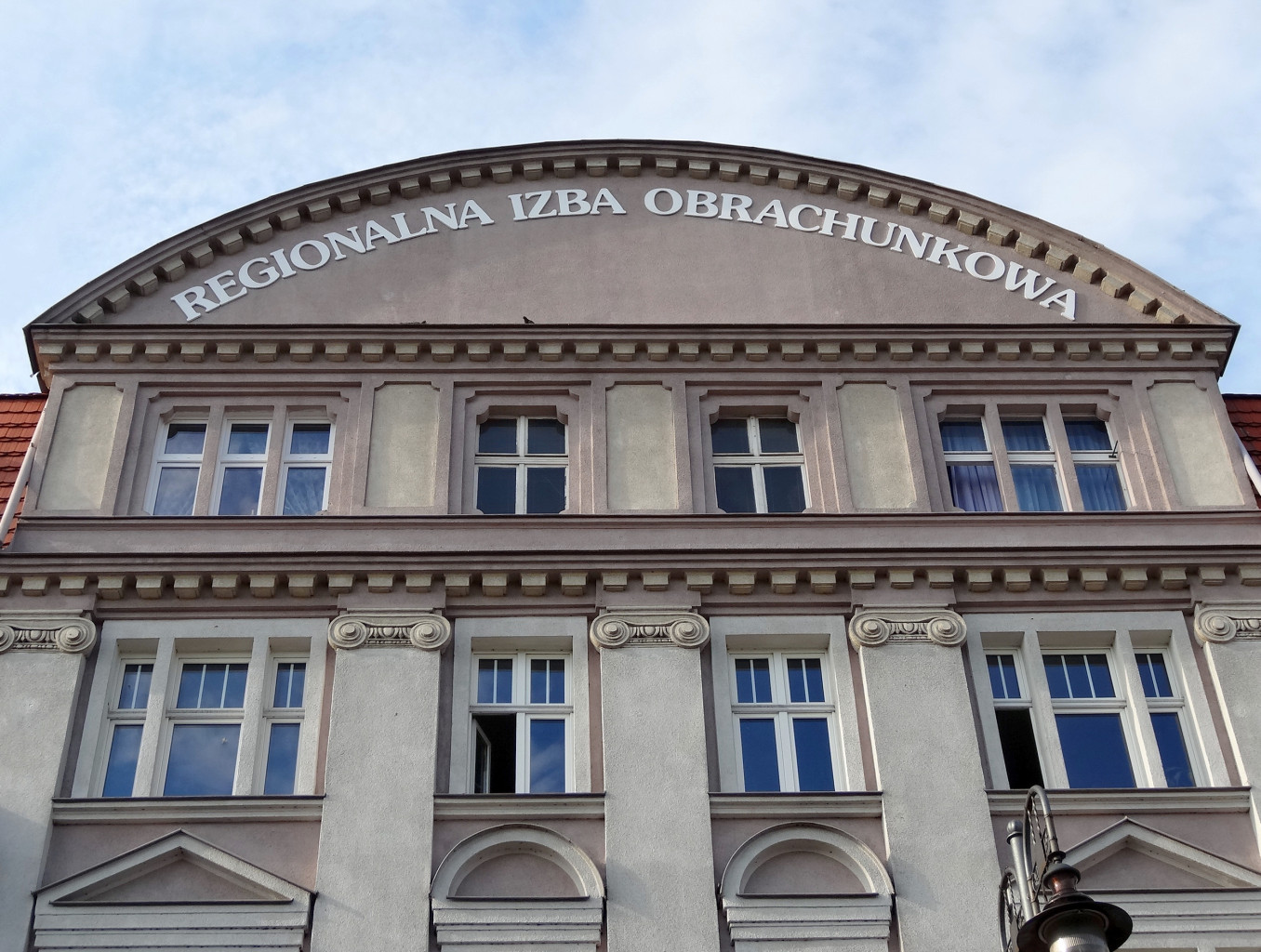
Detail of the top of the frontage

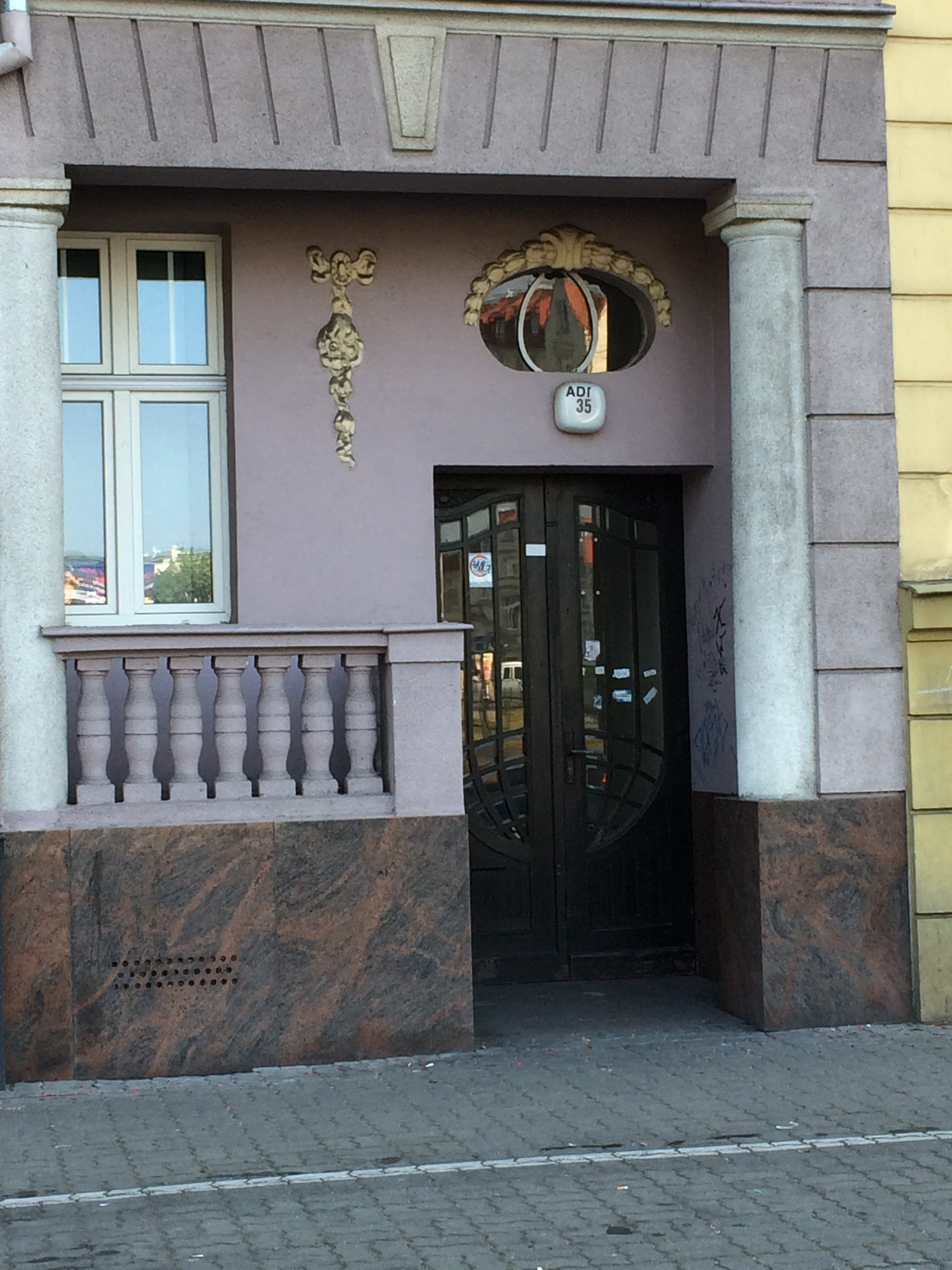
Main gate

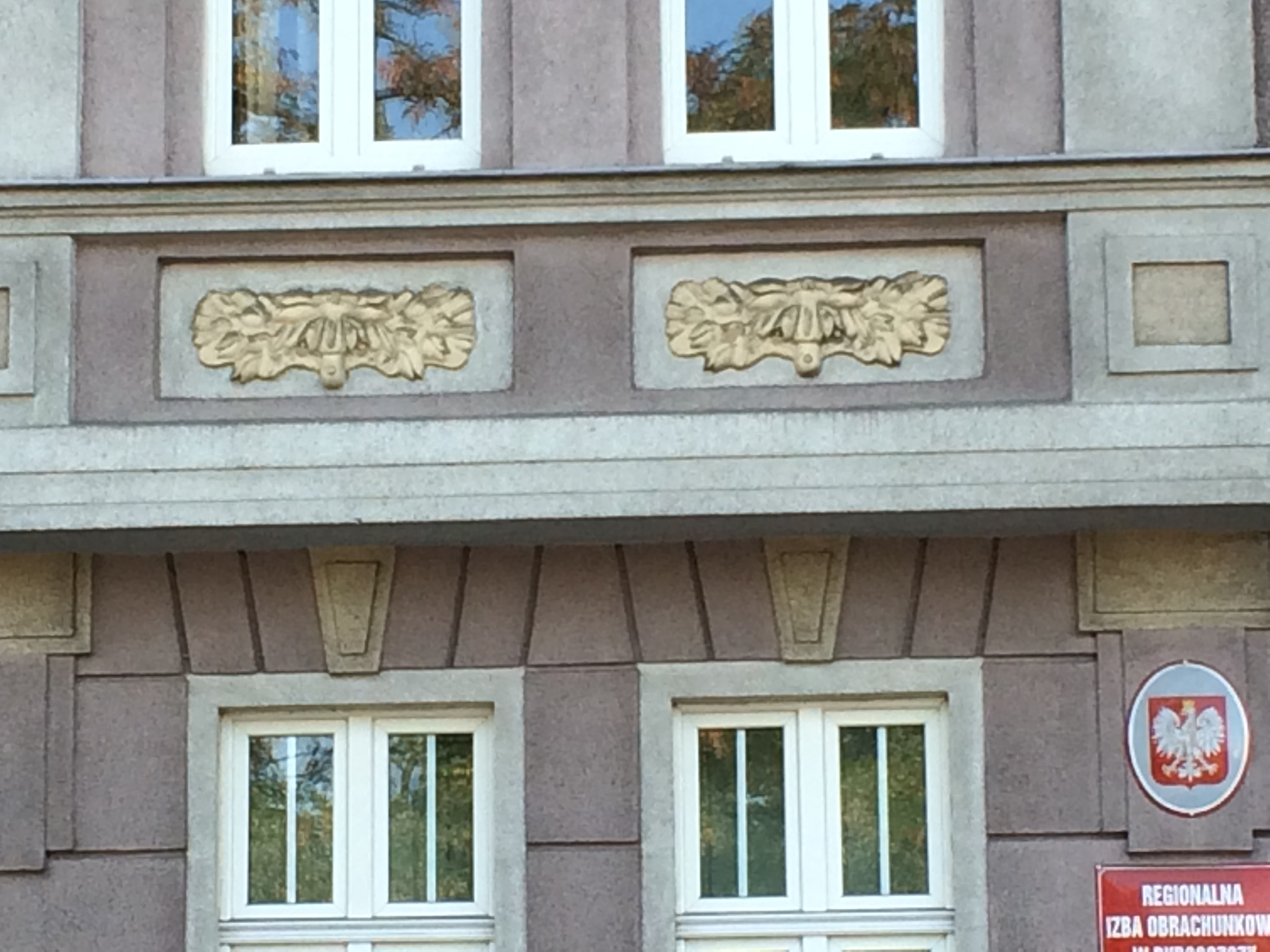
Architectural details

=== Mechanical School Nr.1, at 37 ===
Registered on Kuyavian-Pomeranian Voivodeship Heritage List, Nr.601424, Reg. A/890, (March 23, 1993)

1911, by Otto Brech & Carl Meyer

Neo-Baroque & Eclecticism

The building of the Mechanical School Nr.1 in Bydgoszcz is a historic public building in Bydgoszcz, serving educational purposes. It was christened in 1989, Mechanical School Franciszek Sylwester Jerzy Siemiradzki , an engineer, director of the school from 1923 to 1939.

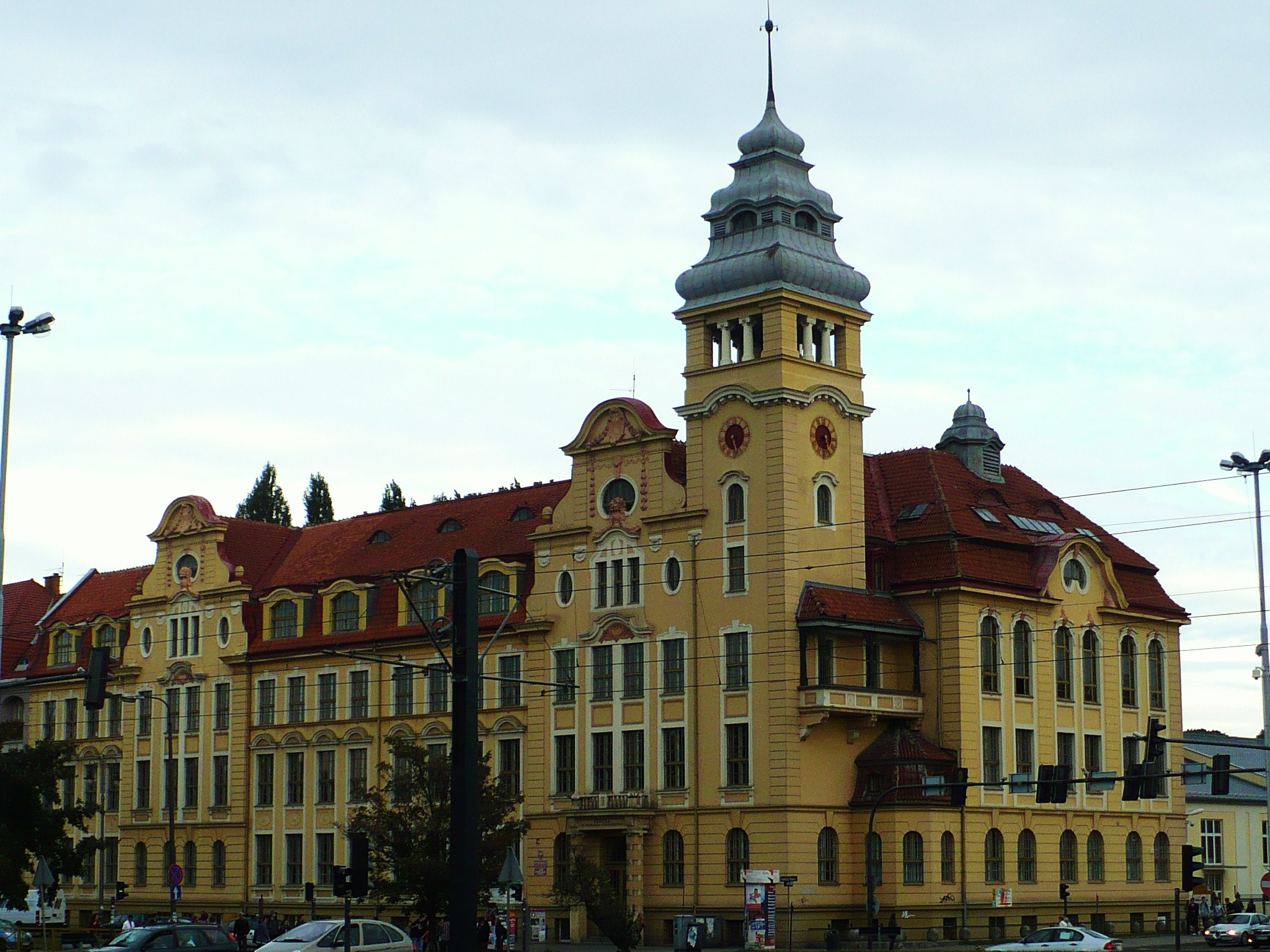
View from Nakielska street

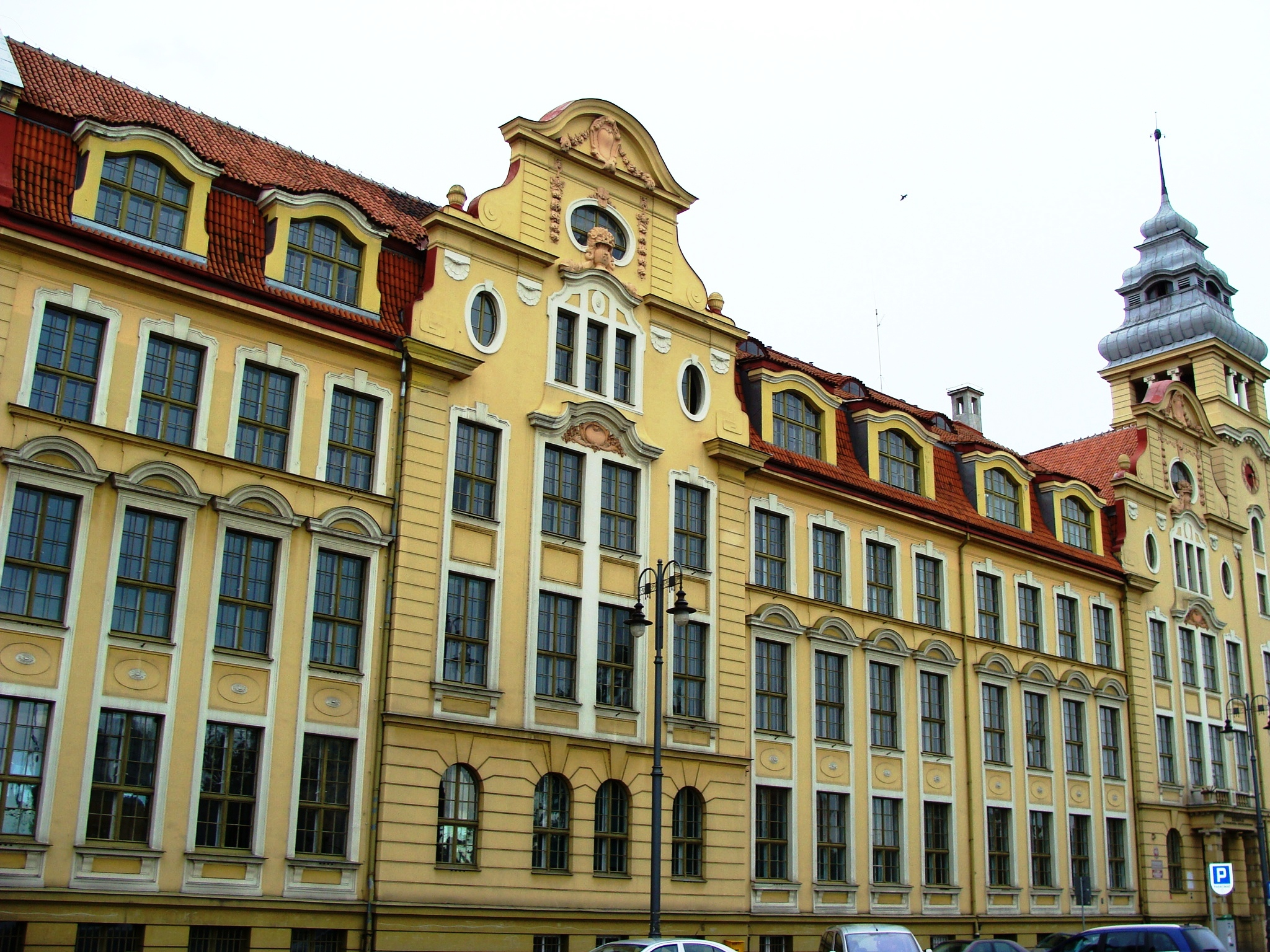
View from Focha Street

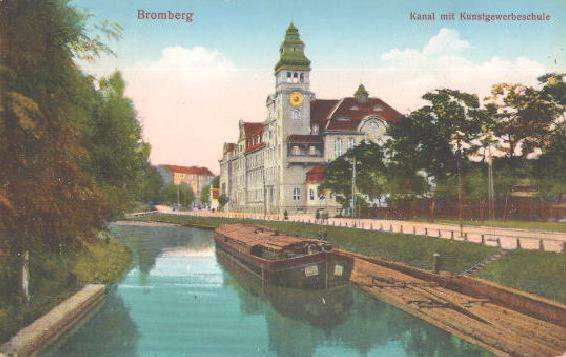
Old Canal with Mechanical school on a 1914 postcard
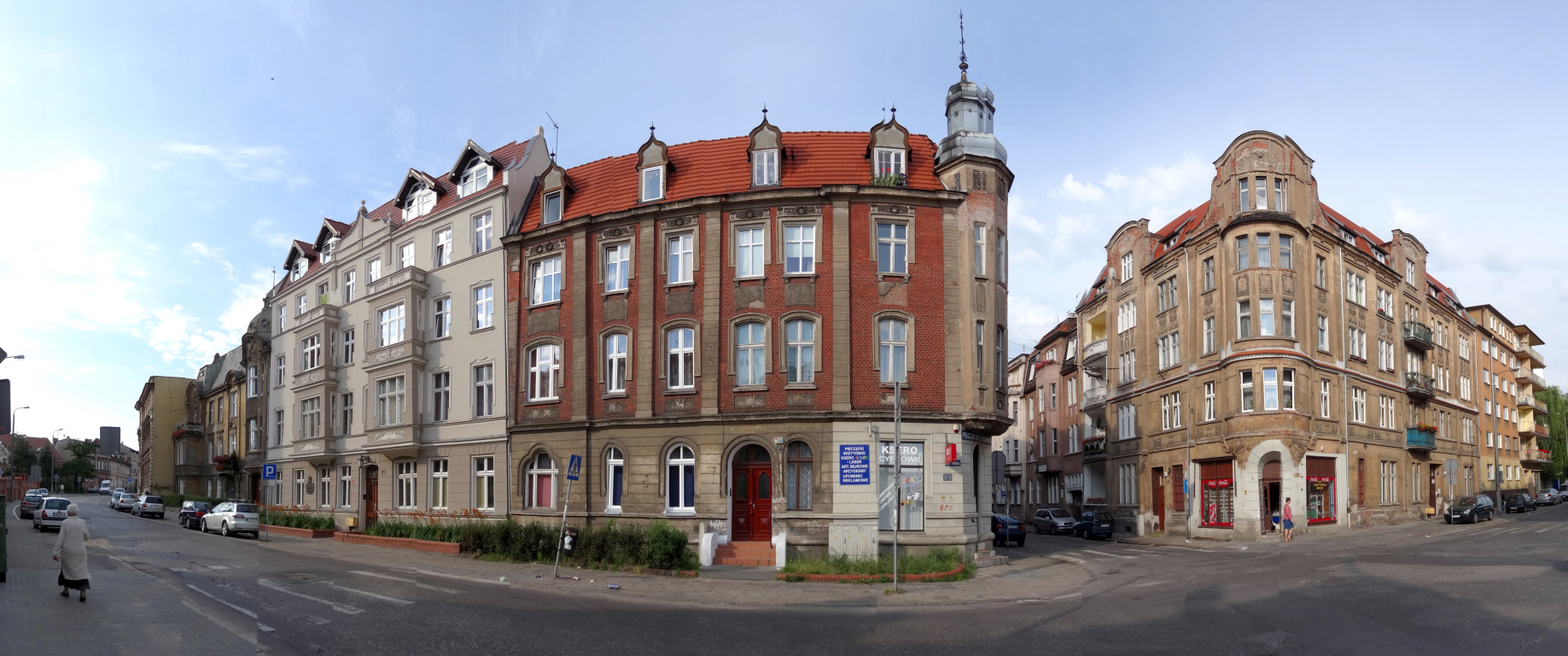
Panorama of Swiętej Trojcy street with Nr.29 (right), 27 (center) and 25 (left)

== See also ==
- Bydgoszcz
- Bydgoszcz Architects (1850-1970s)
