= Kordeckiego Street =

Street in Poland

Coordinates: 53°07′26.4″N 17°59′23.1″E

Kordeckiego street
Bydgoszcz
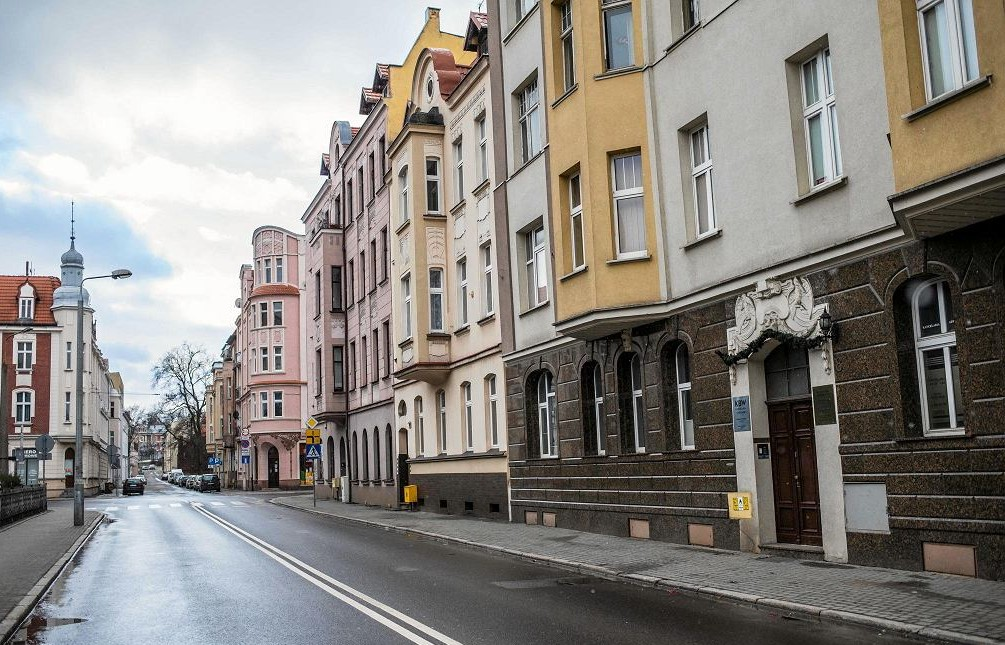
- View of facades at the crossing with Swiętej Trojcy street

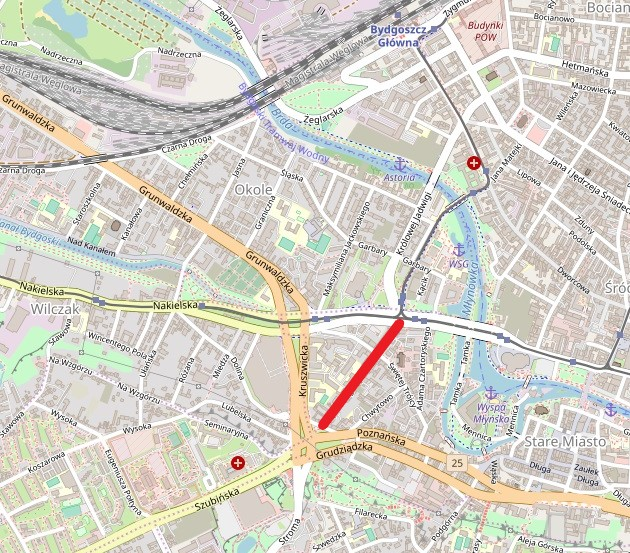
- Kordeckiego Street highlighted on Bydgoszcz map
- Native name: Ulica o. Augustyna Kordeckiego w Bydgoszczy (Polish)
- Former names: Cichorien straße, Hippel straße, ulica Jana Olszewskiego
- Namesake: Augustyn Kordecki
- Owner: City of Bydgoszcz
- Length: 450 m (1,480 ft)Google maps
- Width: ca. 10m
- Area: Downtown district
- Location: Bydgoszcz, Poland

Construction
- Construction start: Early 1850s

Kordeckiego street is located in downtown district of Bydgoszcz, Poland. It has been laid in the 1850s. Many frontages on this street offer architectural interests: some of the buildings are registered on the Kuyavian-Pomeranian Voivodeship Heritage List.

== Location ==
Kordeckiego street runs on a south-west to north-east path: from Plac Poznański in the south to Focha Street in the north, crossing Swiętej Trojcy street on the way.

== History ==
Kordeckiego street is registered on an 1855 address book of Bromberg and appears partially on an 1876 city map under the calling Cichorienstraße. The extension of the street in first years of the 20th century led to a change in the house numbering of the buildings.

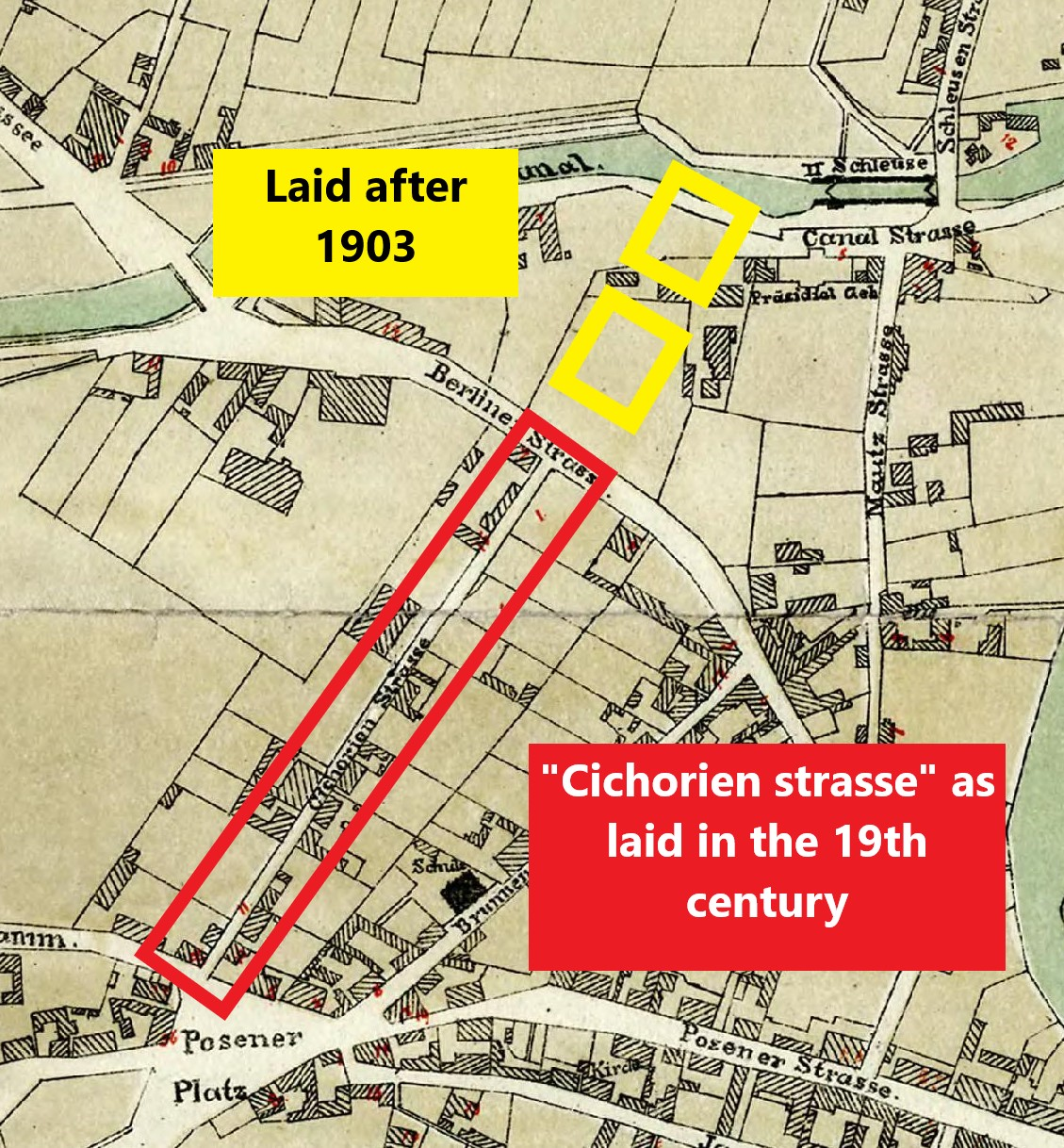
Historical development of Kordeckiego street Bydgoszcz, 19th century

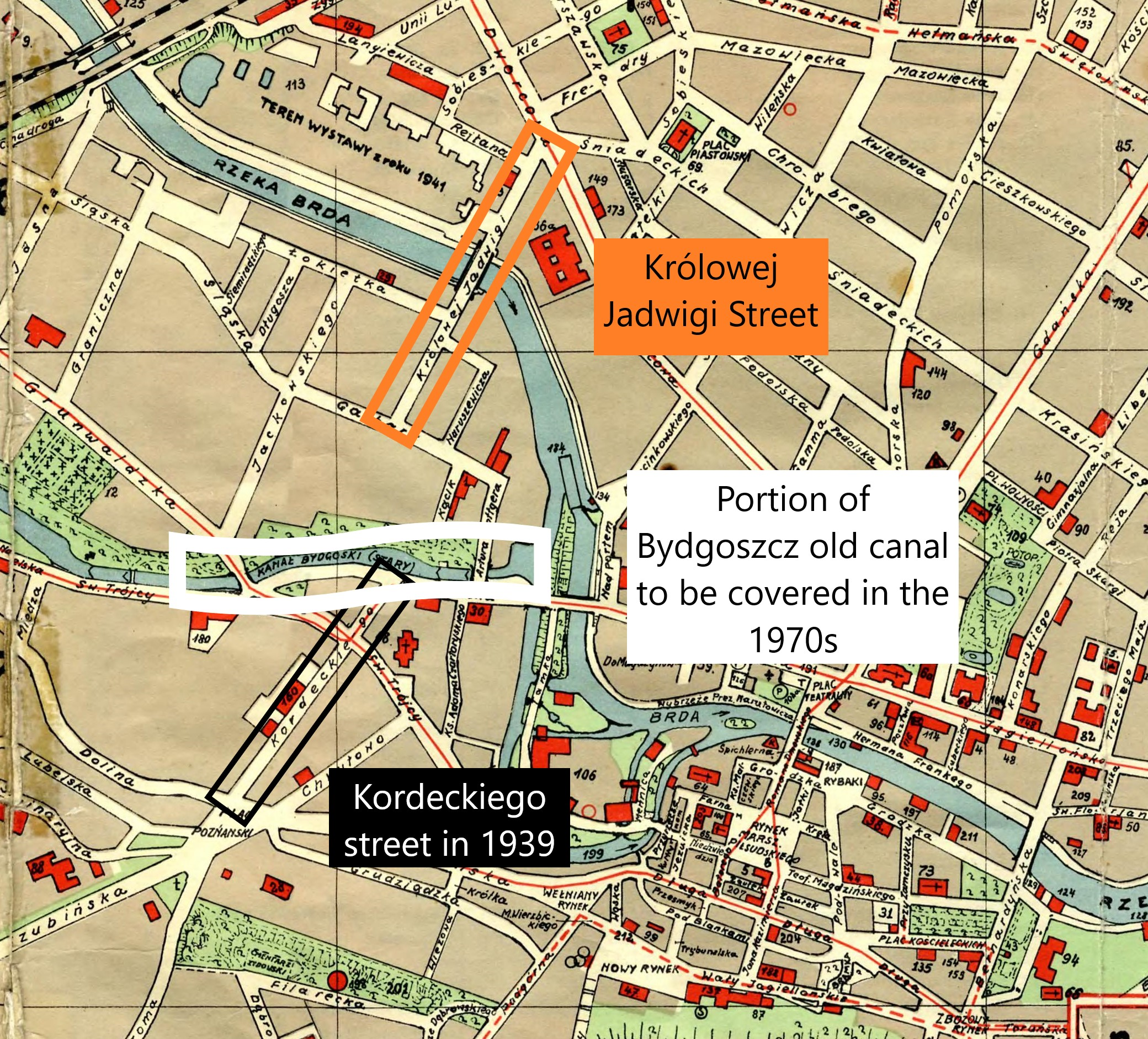
Kordeckiego path in the 20th century

In 1974–1975, after the filling of a portion of Old Bydgoszcz Canal, Kordeckiego street gained connection with Królowej Jadwigi Street at the crossing with Focha street in the north.

Since 2016–2017, municipal authorities launched a move towards renovating buildings in its control.

Through history, this street bore the following names:

- From inception in the 1850s to 1902, Cichorienstraße (German for Chicory street);
- 1903–1920, (von) Hippelstraße, from Theodor Gottlieb von Hippel the Younger (1775–1843), a friend of E. T. A. Hoffmann, who died in Bromberg;
- 1920–1939, Kordeckiego street;
- 1939–1945, (von) Hippelstraße;
- 1945–1950, Kordeckiego street;
- 1950–1991 Jana Olszewskiego street, from Jan Olszewski, a Bydgoszcz councilor, member of trade unions and also activist of the Polish Communist Party;
- Since 1991, Kordeckiego street.

Current name refers to Abbot Augustyn Kordecki (1603–1673), a prior of the Jasna Góra Monastery during the period of the Deluge.

== Main areas and edifices ==
Tenements located north of Świętej Trójcy street crossing (i.e. Nr.4,5,6,8,10,12) have all been erected after the extension of the street at the beginning of the 20th century.

=== Tenement at 4 Kordeckiego ===
1910

Late Art Nouveau

The first landlord of the house was Adolf Müller, a painter.

The facade bears late Art Nouveau characteristics. Its main feature is the avant-corps overhanging the main door: it carries openings with wrought iron railings and a loggia crowned by a tented roof-like top. One can also highlight the preserved wood-carved entry door with a large transom window.

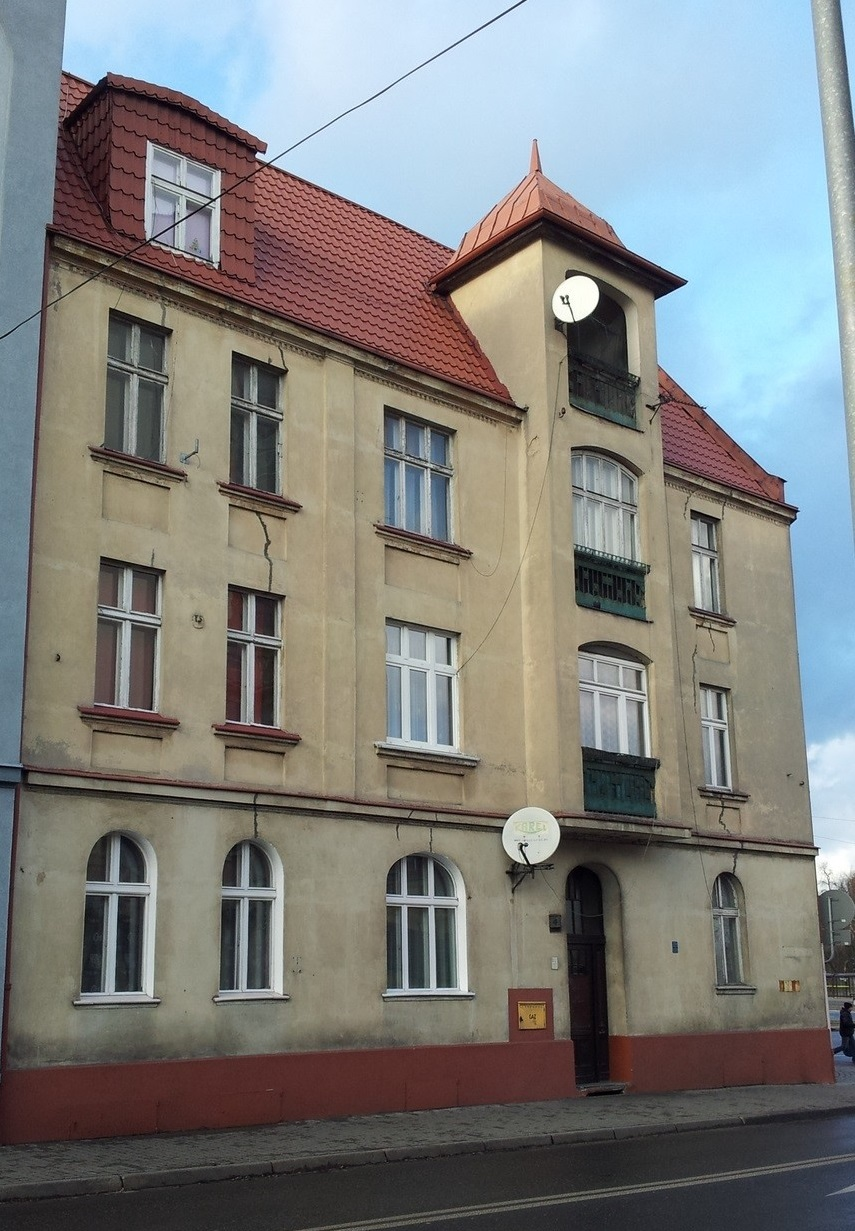
Main elevation

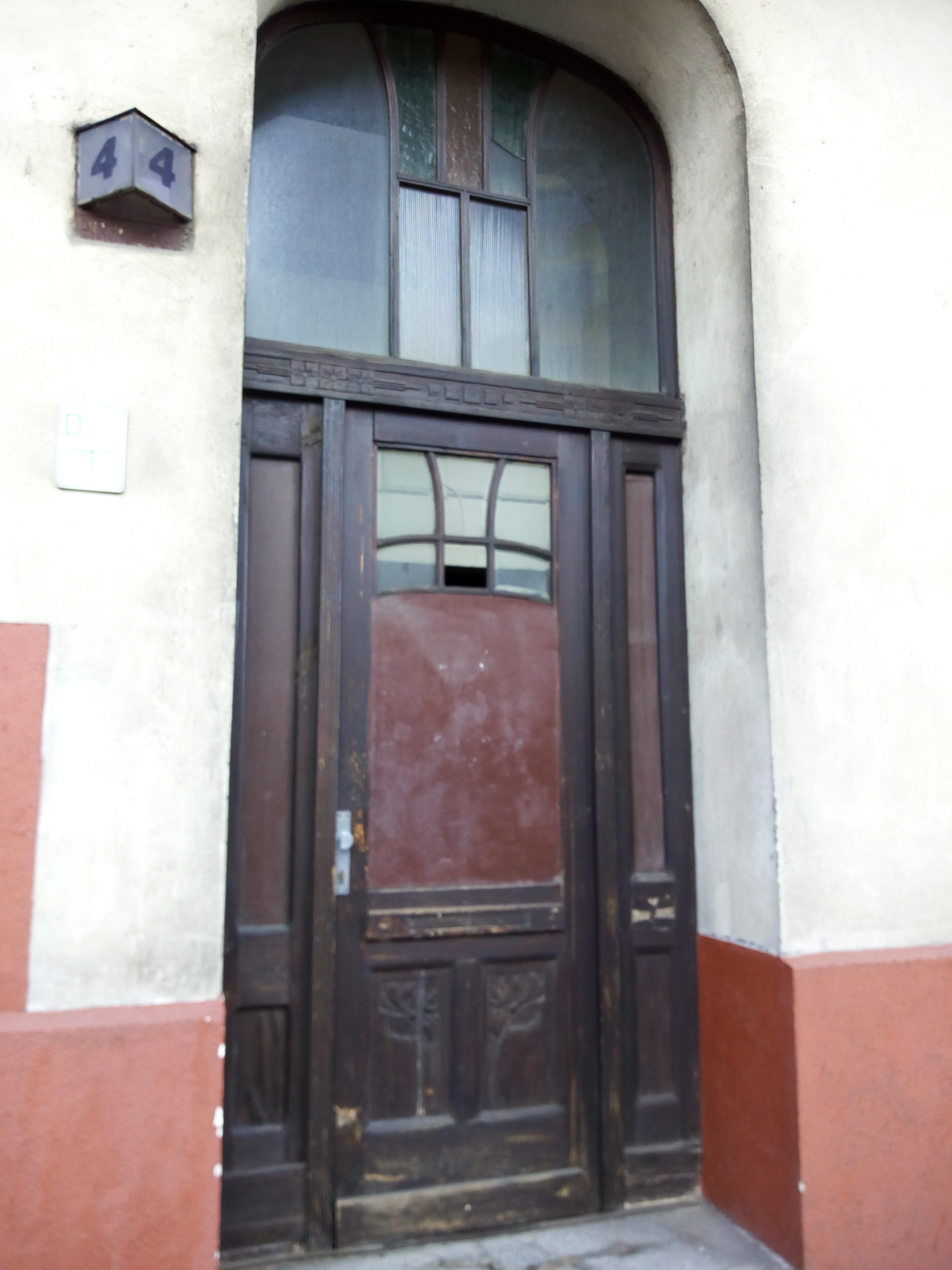
Street door

=== Villa Korth, at 5 Kordeckiego ===
1910-1912

Neo-renaissance

Bernard Korth was the commissioner of this villa at the very place where he had his factory of Industrial machine for water supply and drainage systems, industrial elevators and cleaning machines. The plot then occupied the entire corner between the villa and Świętej Trójcy street. Korth had also a branch on Kanal straße, today's western tip of Focha street. Bernhard's son, Bruno, took over the business in the 1920s till the start of WII.

The villa features neo-renaissance elements and echoes similar buildings in nearby Swiętej Trojcy street (Nr.8 and 21). One can notice the heavy bossage on the facades ridges, the flower-shaped wrought iron decoration of the fence pillars, the roof lantern and the dormer tented roof topped by a finial.

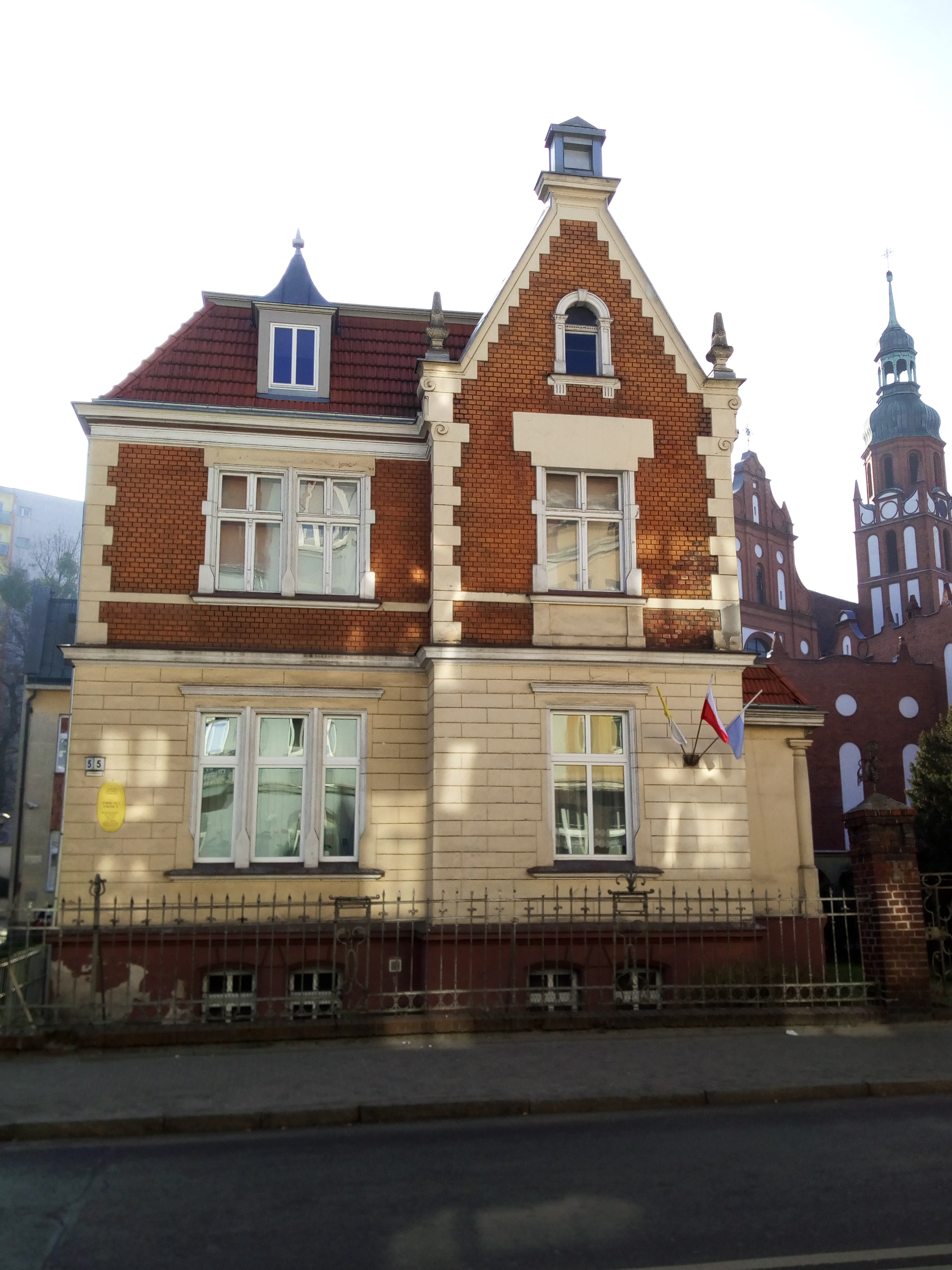
View from the street

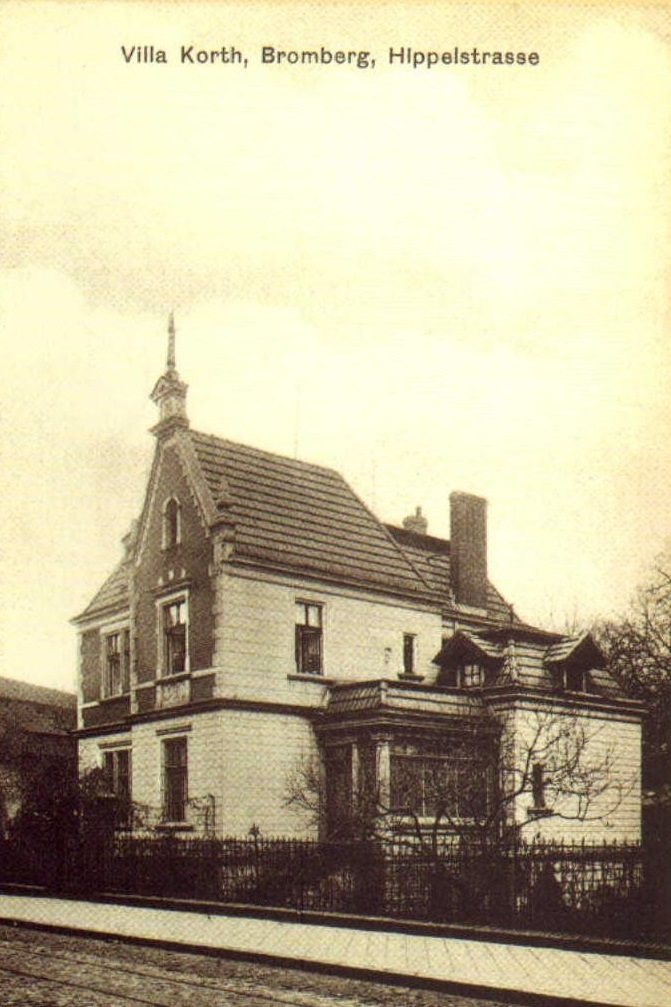
Villa Korth at the beginning of the 20th century

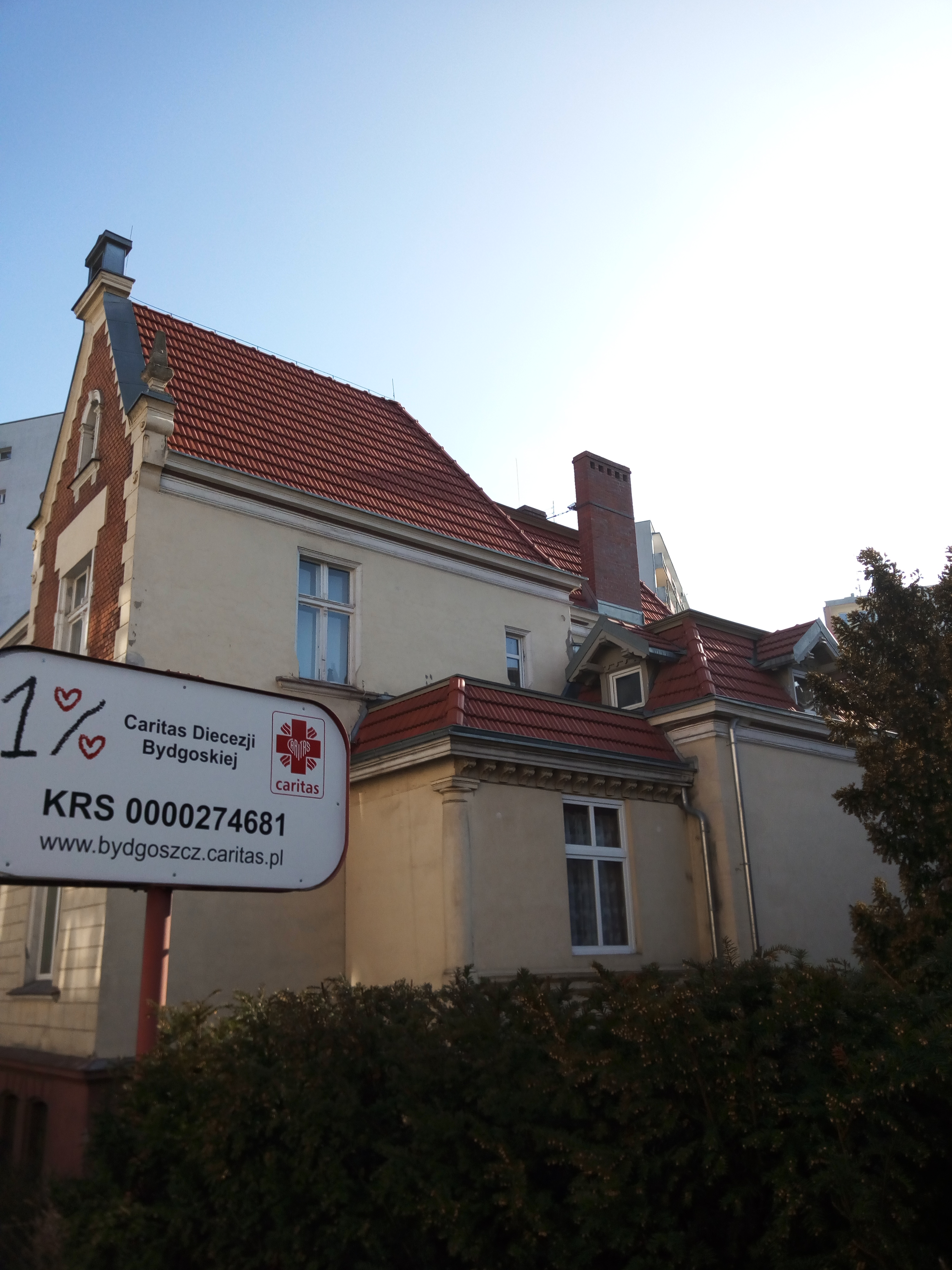
Side view

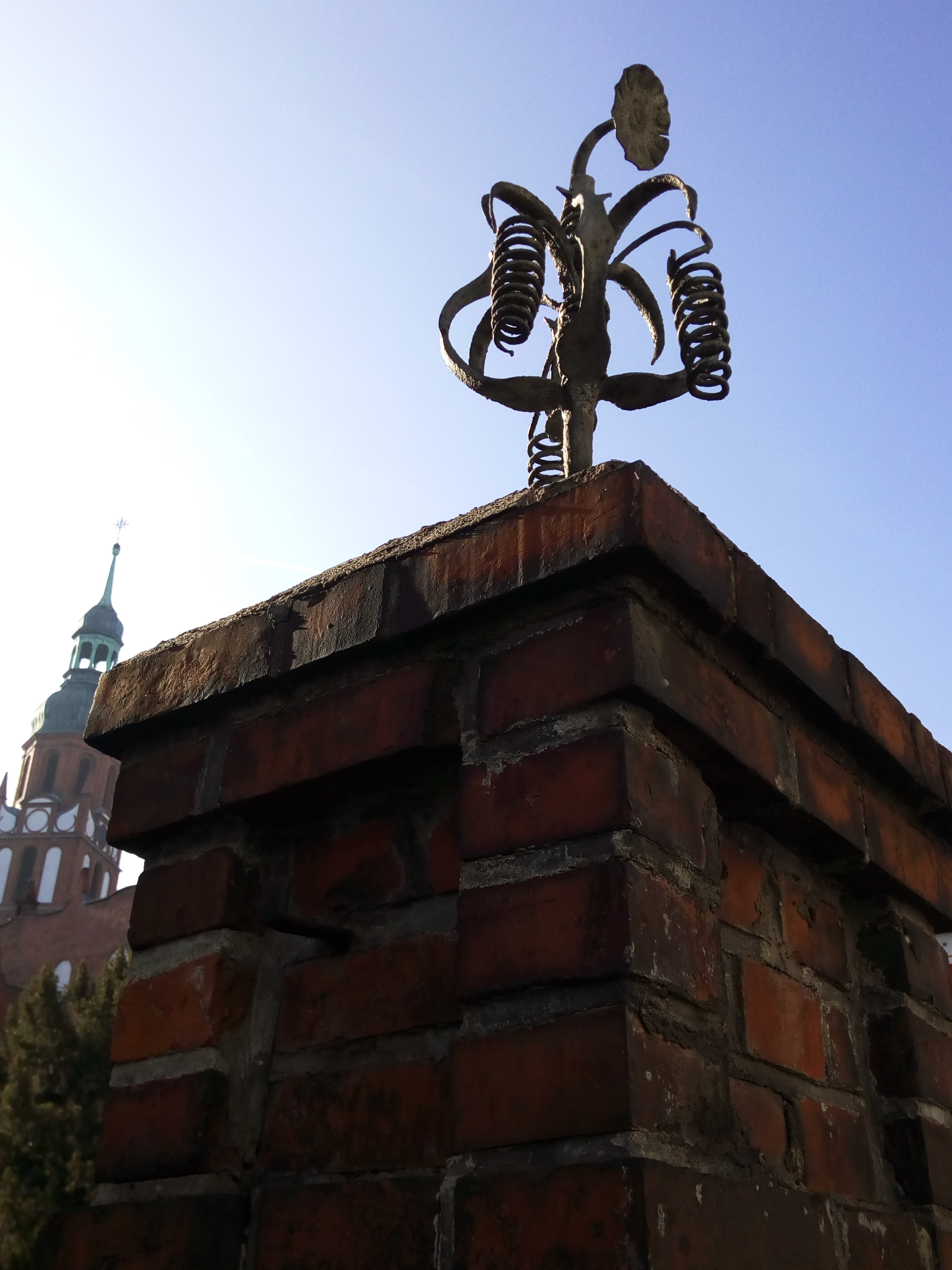
Flower-shaped wrought iron decoration of the fencing

=== Tenement at 6 Kordeckiego ===
1912, by Johannes Cornelius

Late Art Nouveau, early Modern architecture

Adolf Müller, the painter living at then Hippel straße 4, was also the first owner of this tenement at its inception.

The architectural elements composing the elevation show a transition to early modernism style: a predominance of straight vertical lines and very few details recall the gone Art Nouveau style (e.g. the ornamented balconies).

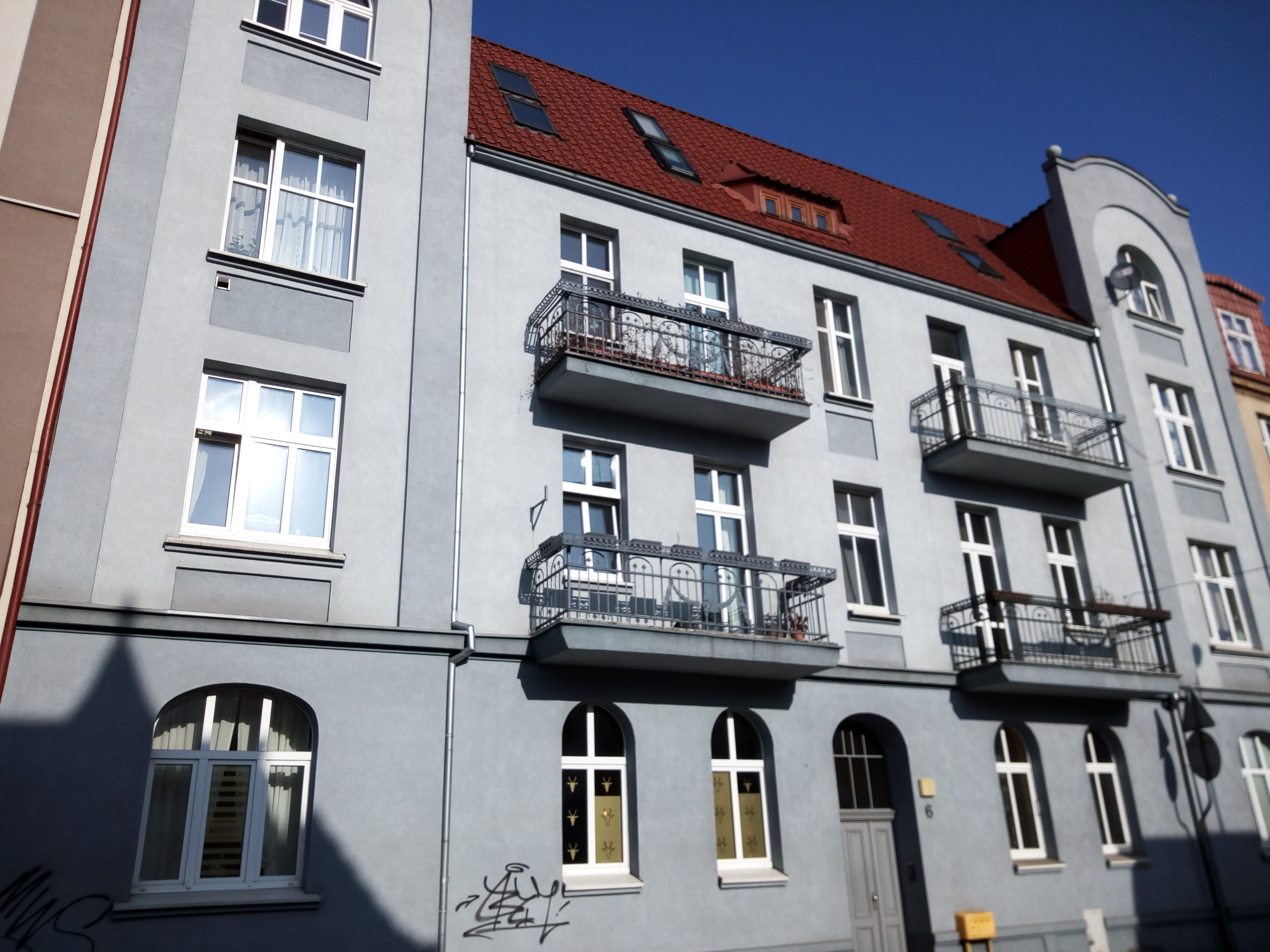
Main elevation from the street

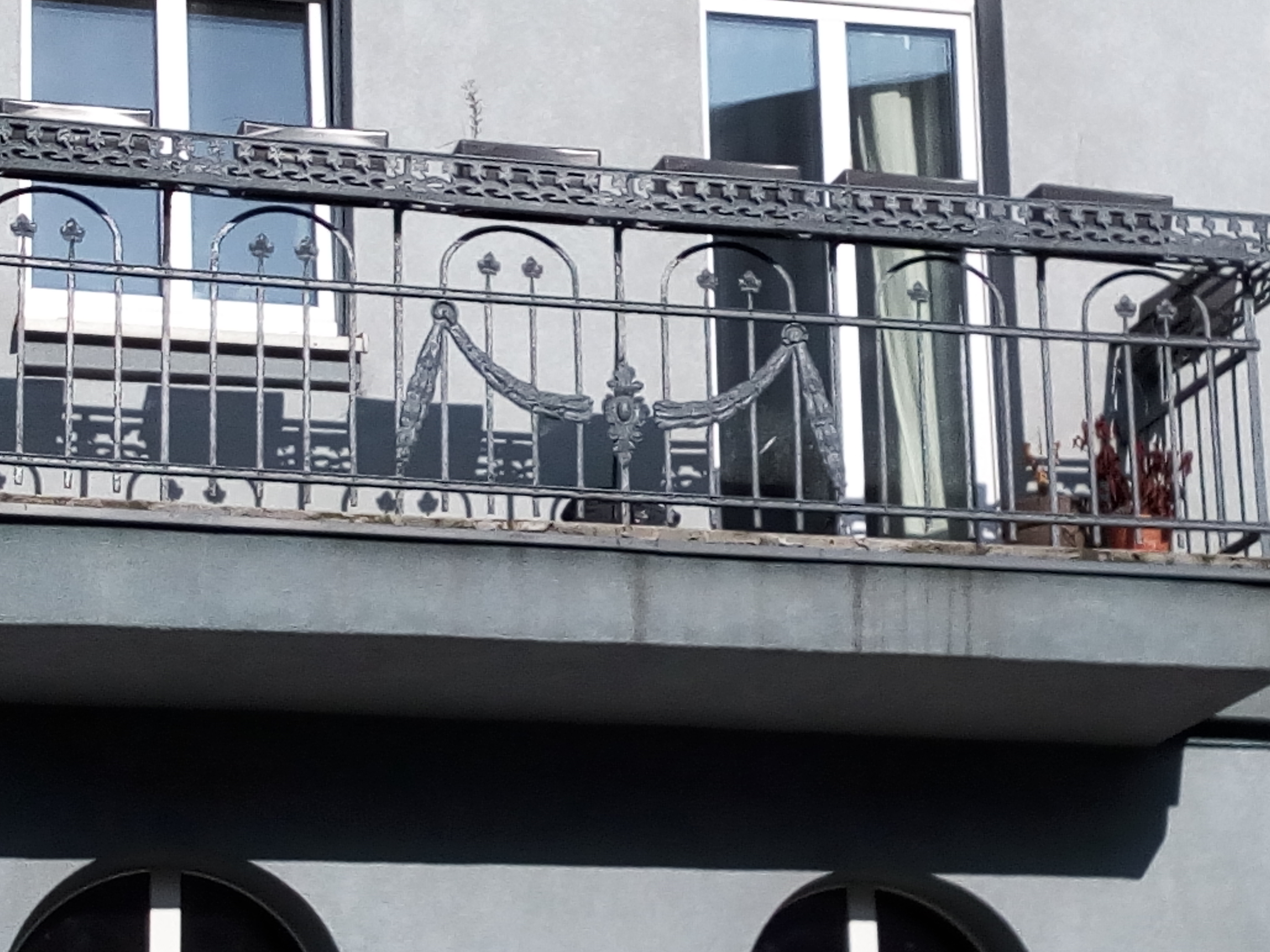
Adorned wrought iron balcony

=== Tenement at 8 Kordeckiego ===
1910, by Johannes Cornelius

Art Nouveau

The house, initially located at Hippel straße 2, was owned by Artur Zemisch who ran a construction company and lived there. He was also the landlord of the tenement at 30 Swiętej Trojcy street.

Although stripped of architectural details, the facade still features two balanced avant-corps bearing canted bay windows. The ground floor is adorned with dark marble and surrounds a portal decorated with Art Nouveau stuccoed motifs.

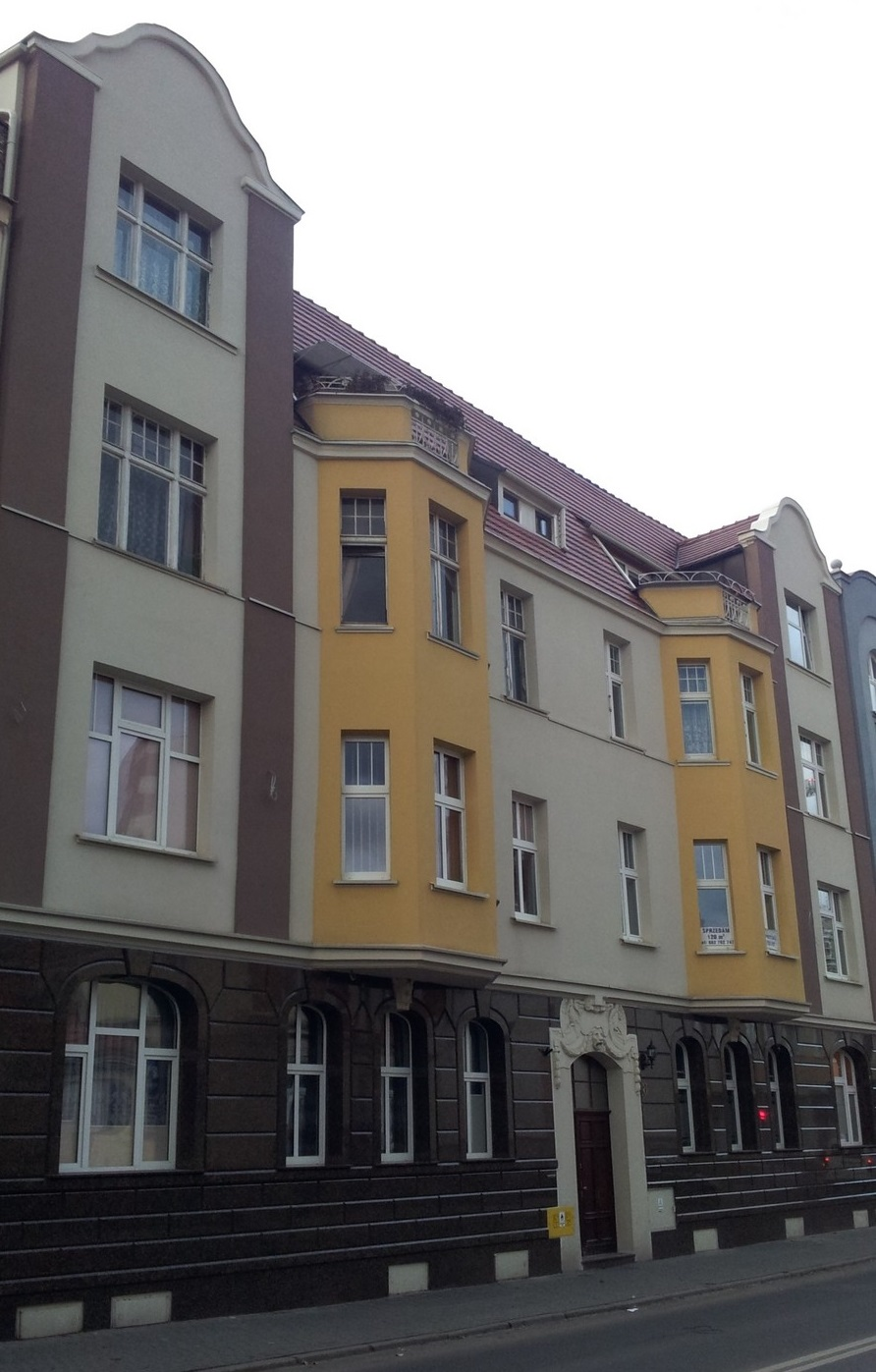
Main frontage

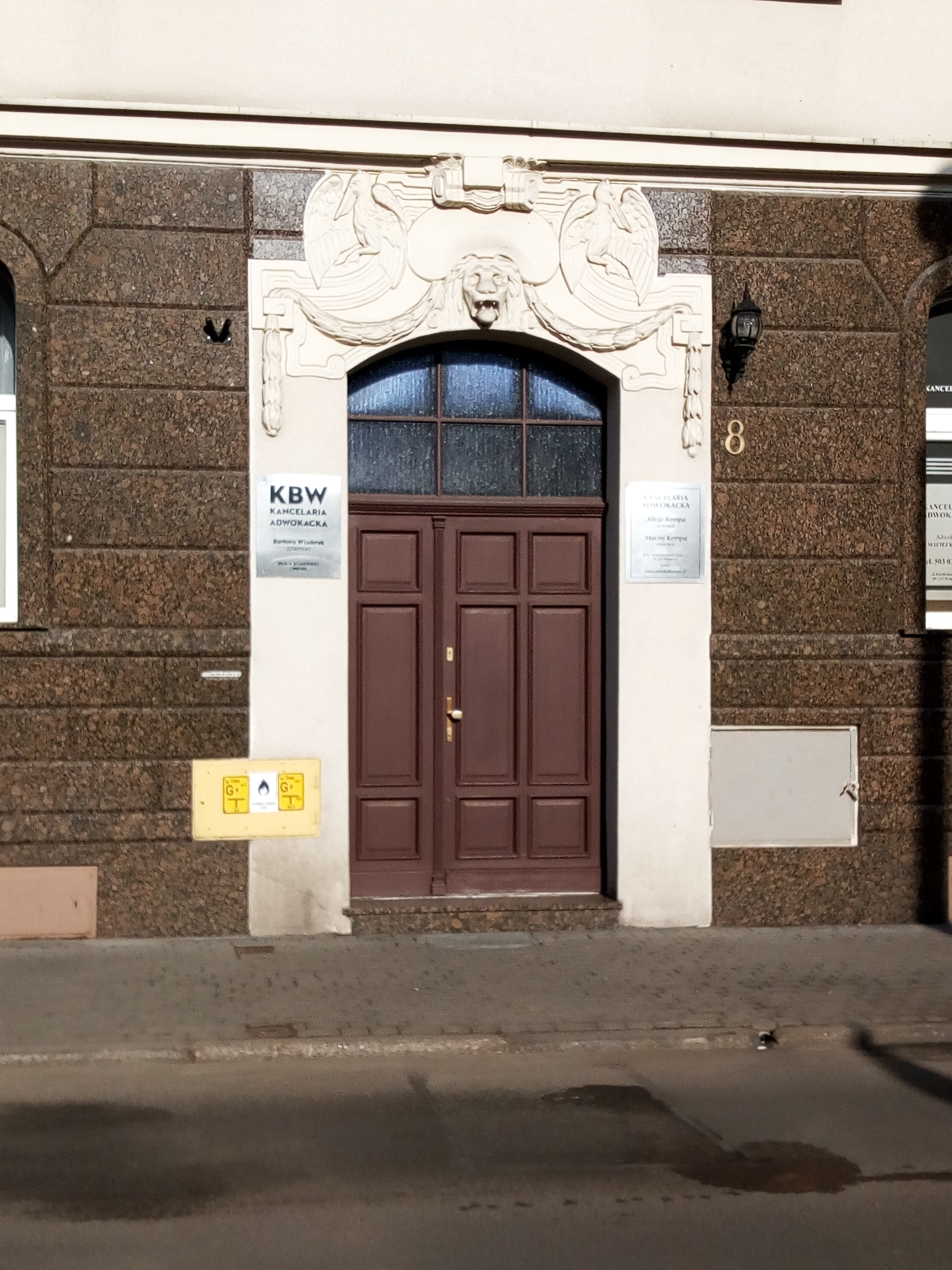
Main door and portal

=== Tenement at 9 Kordeckiego, corner with 27 Swiętej Trojcy street ===
1905

German Historicism

The house, initially at Berliner straße 6b, was owned by a smith, Anton Hertzke. It was bought in the early 1910s by Carl ßeilke, a factory manager. His widow lived there till 1926. The building has experienced a thorough overhaul in 2016–2017.

The tenement boasts two facades on the street of equivalent features: round top windows on the ground floor, the upper floors are all brick covered, with cartouches and long pilasters. Top wall dormers have ogee shapes. The corner of the building carries a thin bay window, much like a bartizan, crowned by an onion dome roof with a finial.

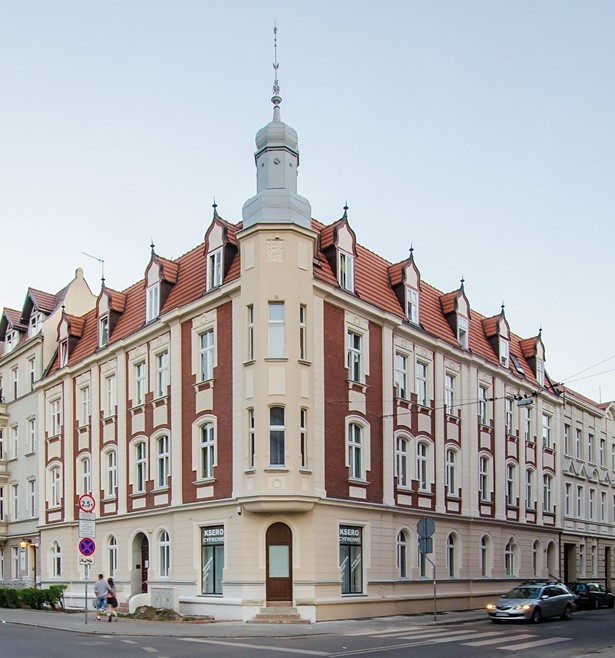
View of the building from street crossing

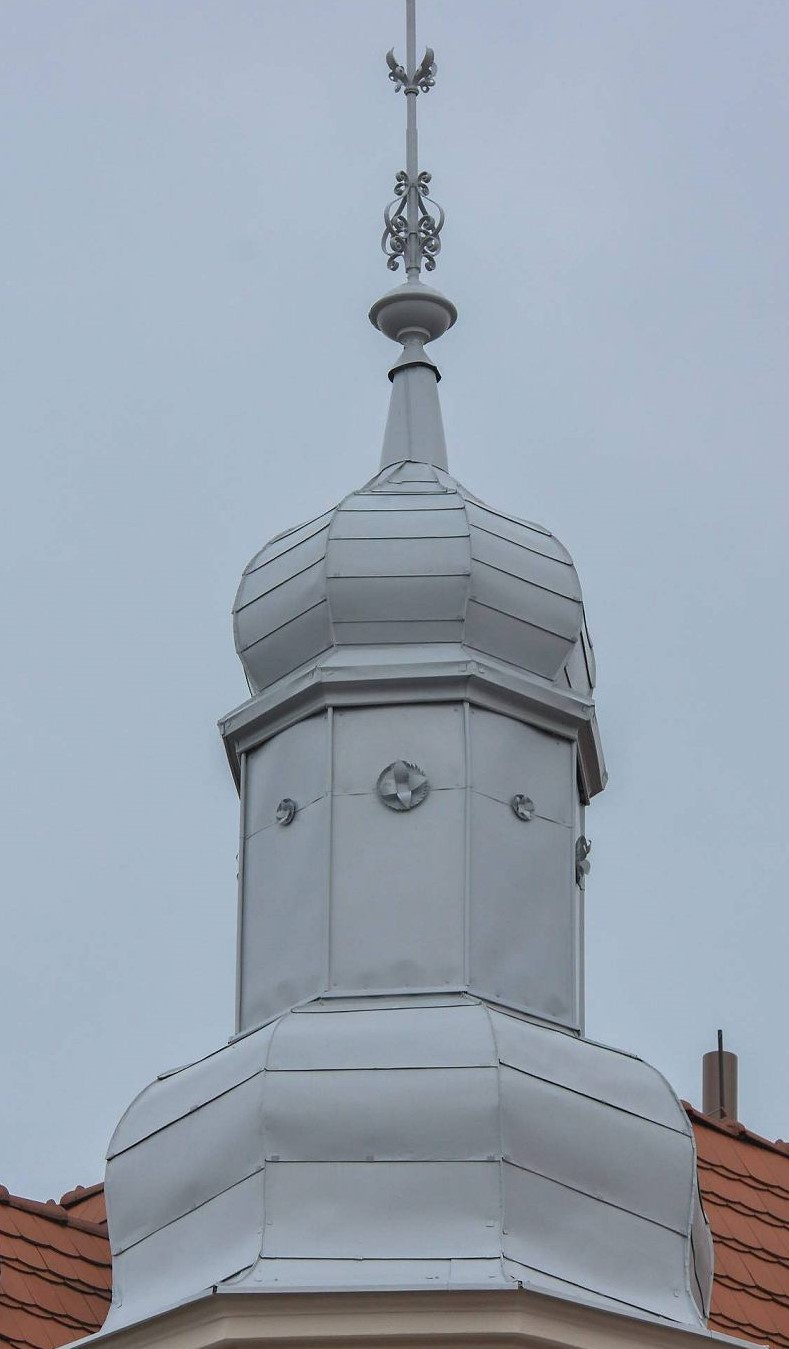
Detail of the finial

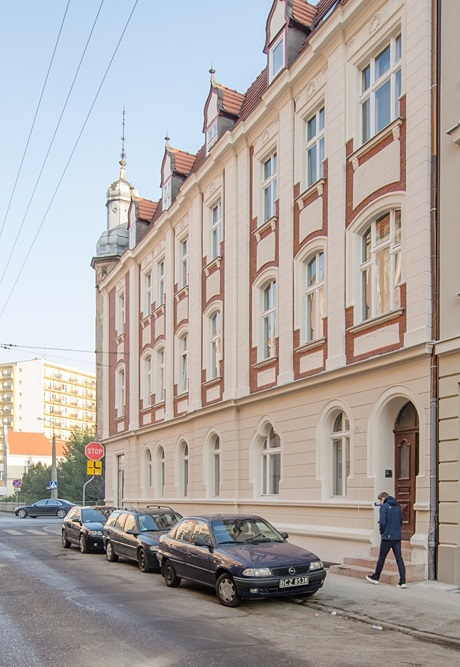
Facade on Kordeckiego

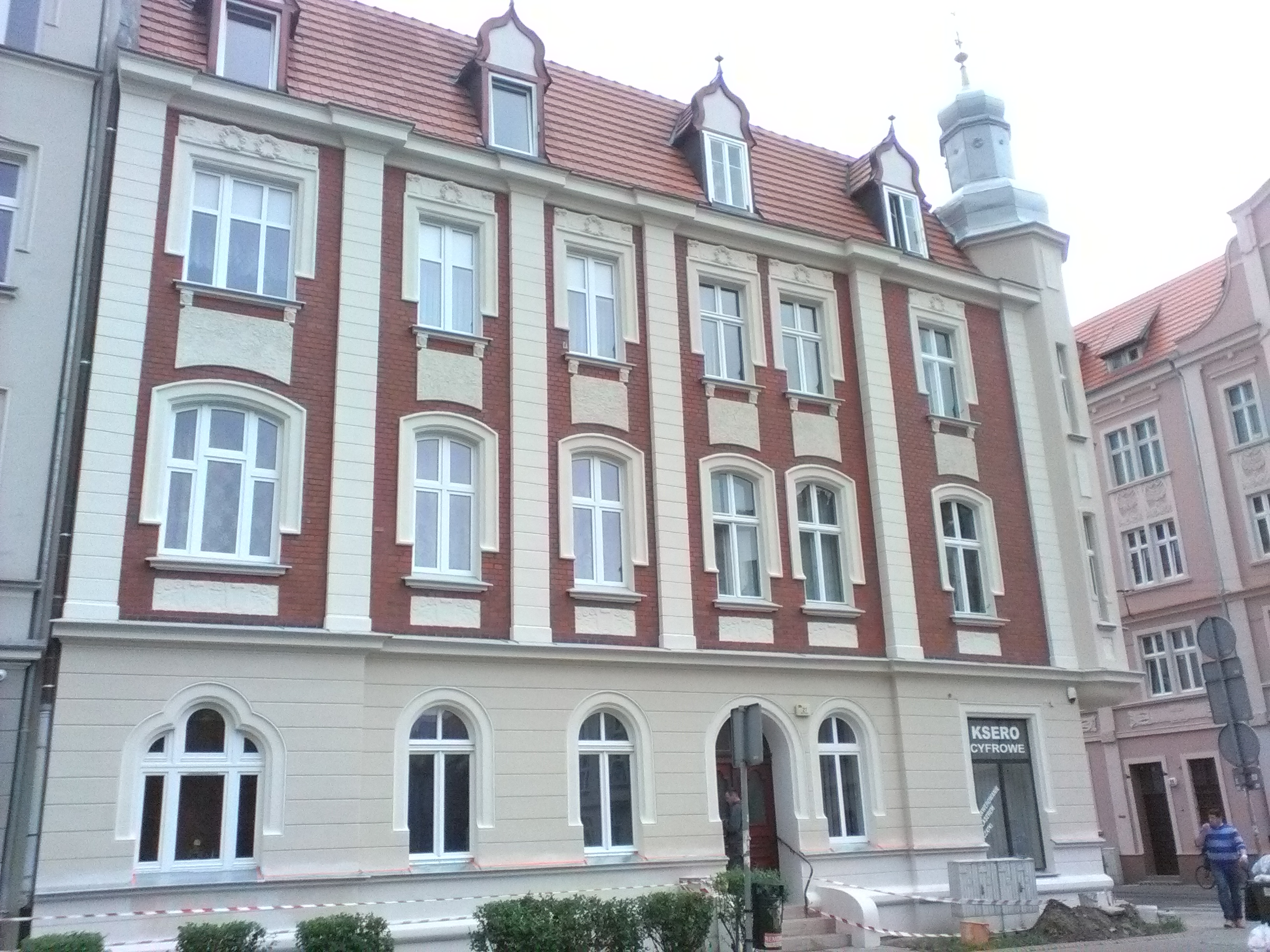
Facade on Swiętej Trojcy street

=== Tenement at 10 Kordeckiego ===
1912

Art Nouveau

First registered landlord was Johann Sikorski, running a restaurant at abutting Nr.12. He did not live in this tenement.

The frontage displays a few Art Nouveau details, such as the decorated cartouches around the openings, the floral motifs on lintels or the round-shaped transom window above the main door.

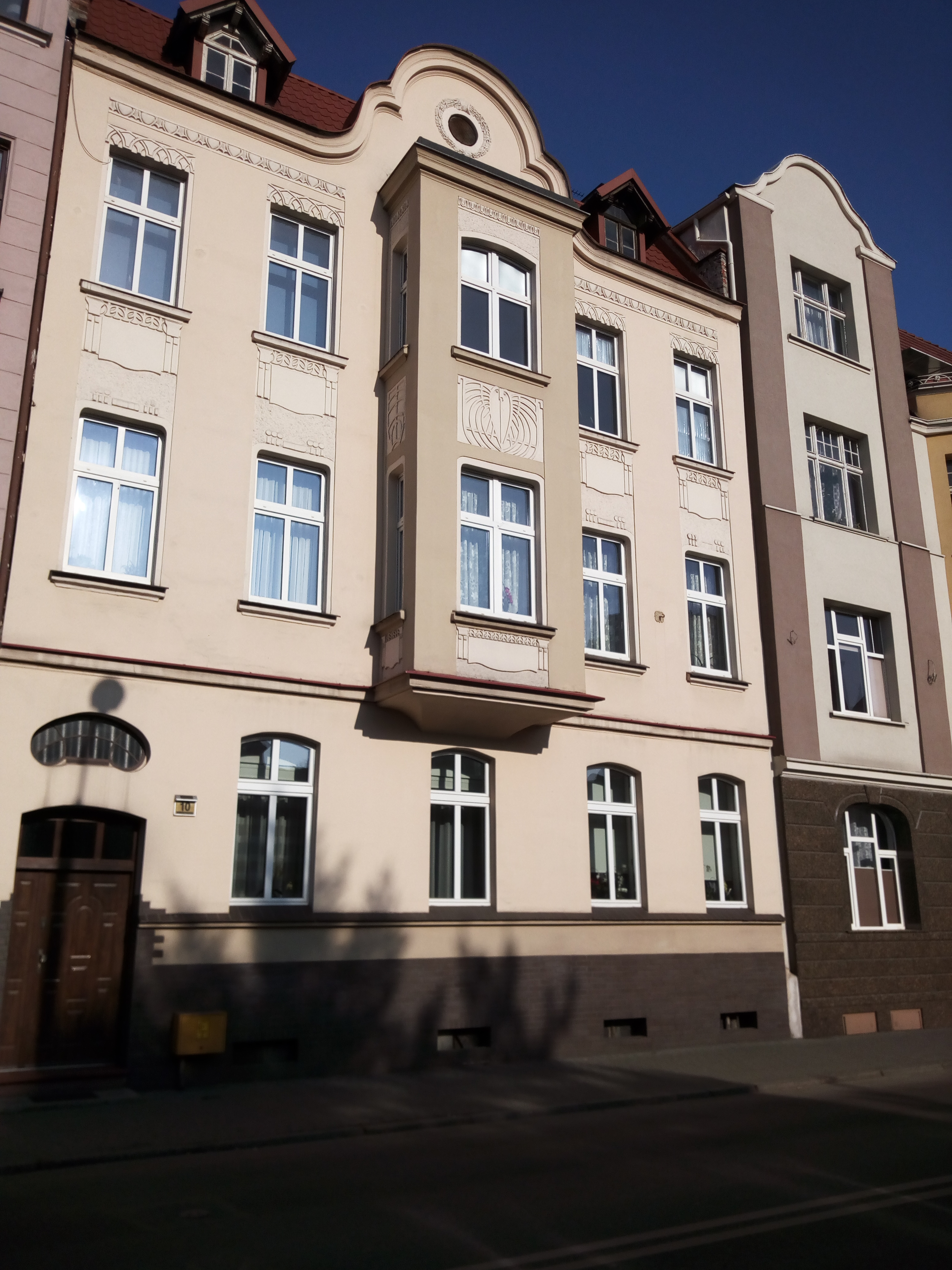
Main frontage

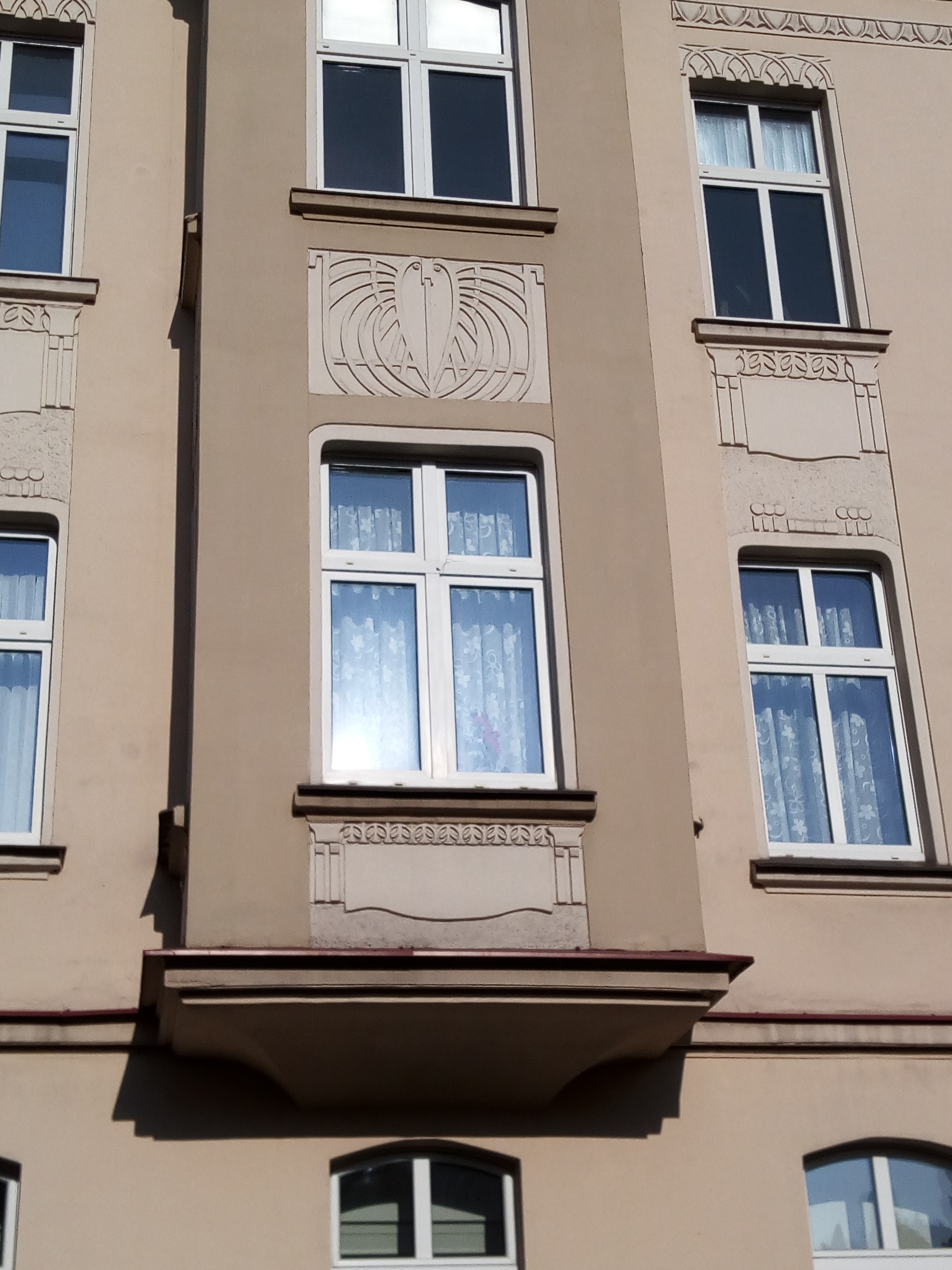
Oriel window

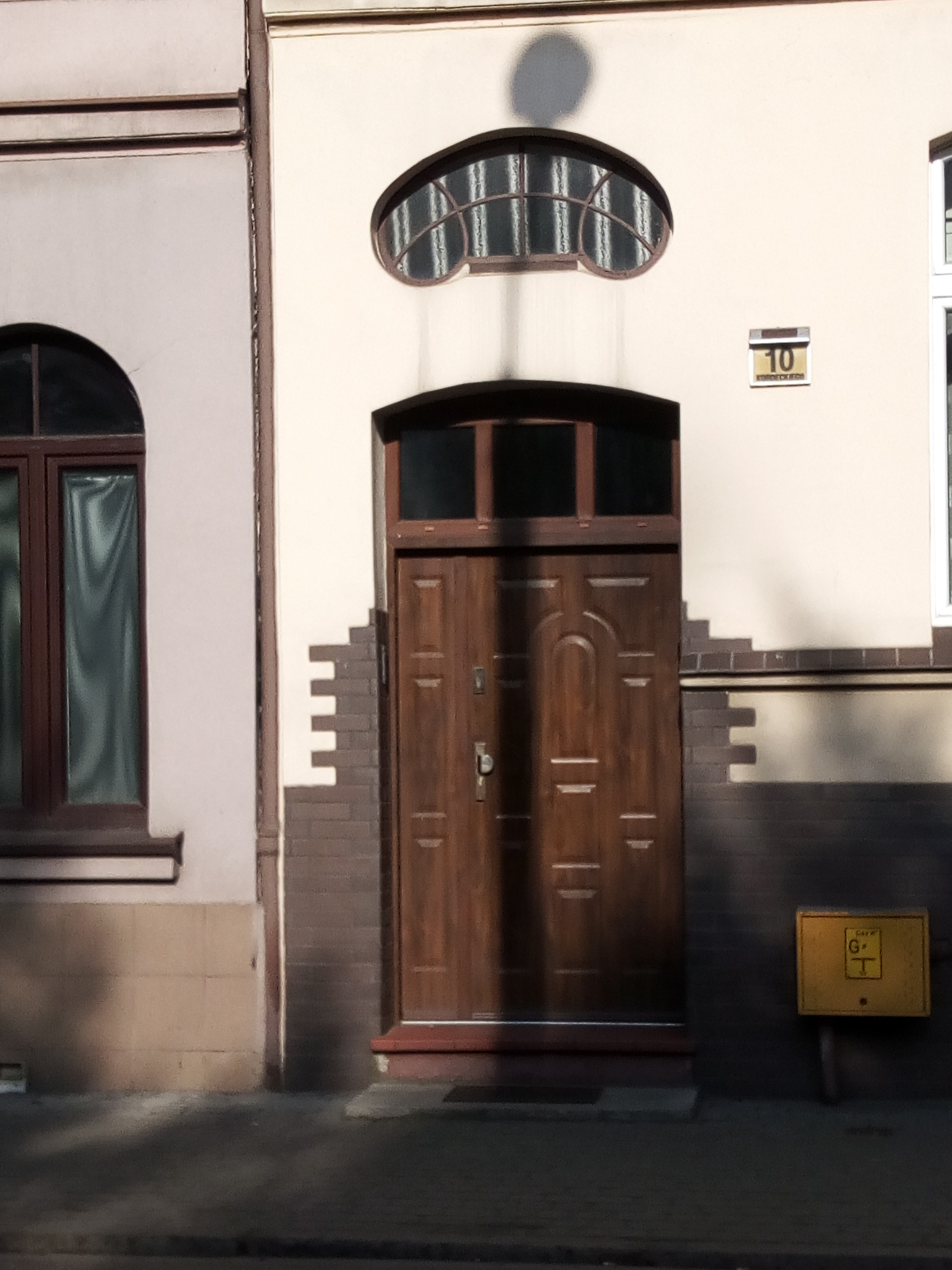
Main door

=== Tenement at 11 Kordeckiego ===
1900s

Eclecticism

The building was initially owned by Carl August Franke, an affluent entrepreneur of Bromberg.

The symmetrical facade is characterized by pedimented windows at each floor and the absence of any superfluous details.

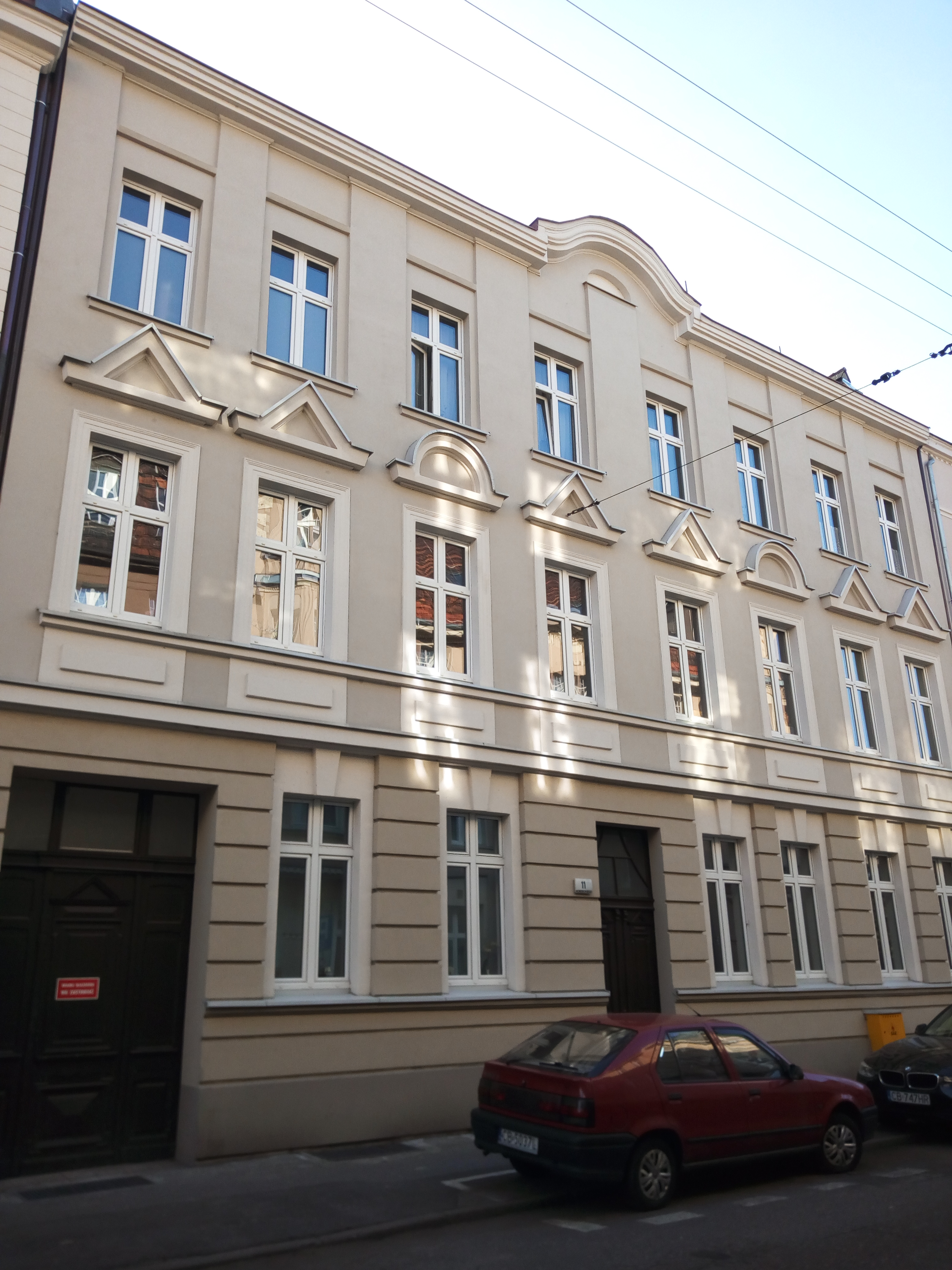
Main elevation

=== Tenement at 12 Kordeckiego, corner with Swiętej Trojcy street ===
1898

Art Nouveau

The plot belonged to Johann Sikorski, a restaurateur who had the tenement erected at the end of the 19th century. Initially at Hippelstraße 1, the building had been the property of the Sikorski family till the end of the 1930s.

The tenement boasts Art Nouveau details, especially in the use of cartouches, pediments and friezes. The facade on Kordieckiego street is the most ornamented, the other one having lost its decoration. Both elevation have oriel windows with a balcony and are topped with an ogee shaped wall dormer.

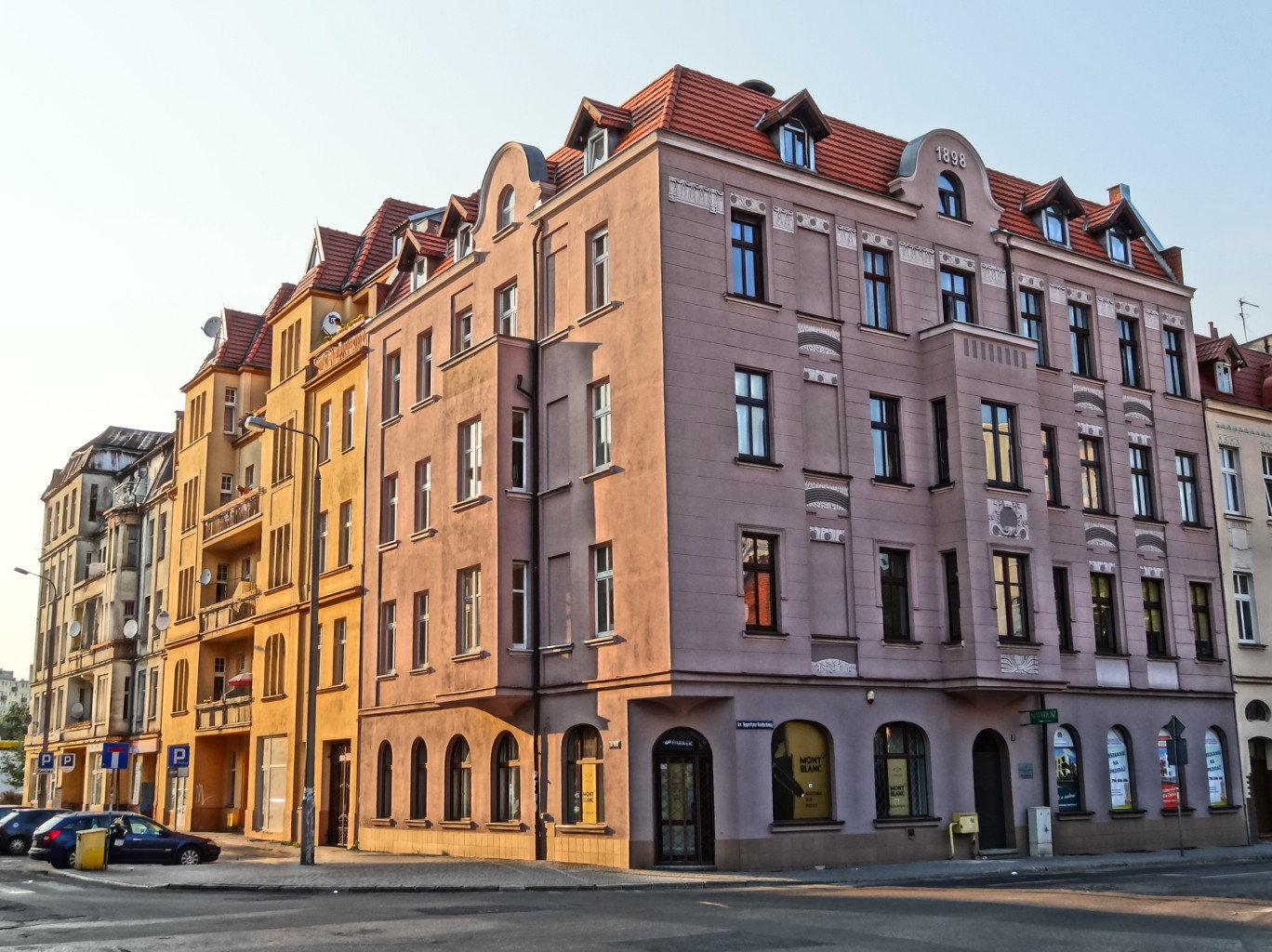
View from streets intersection

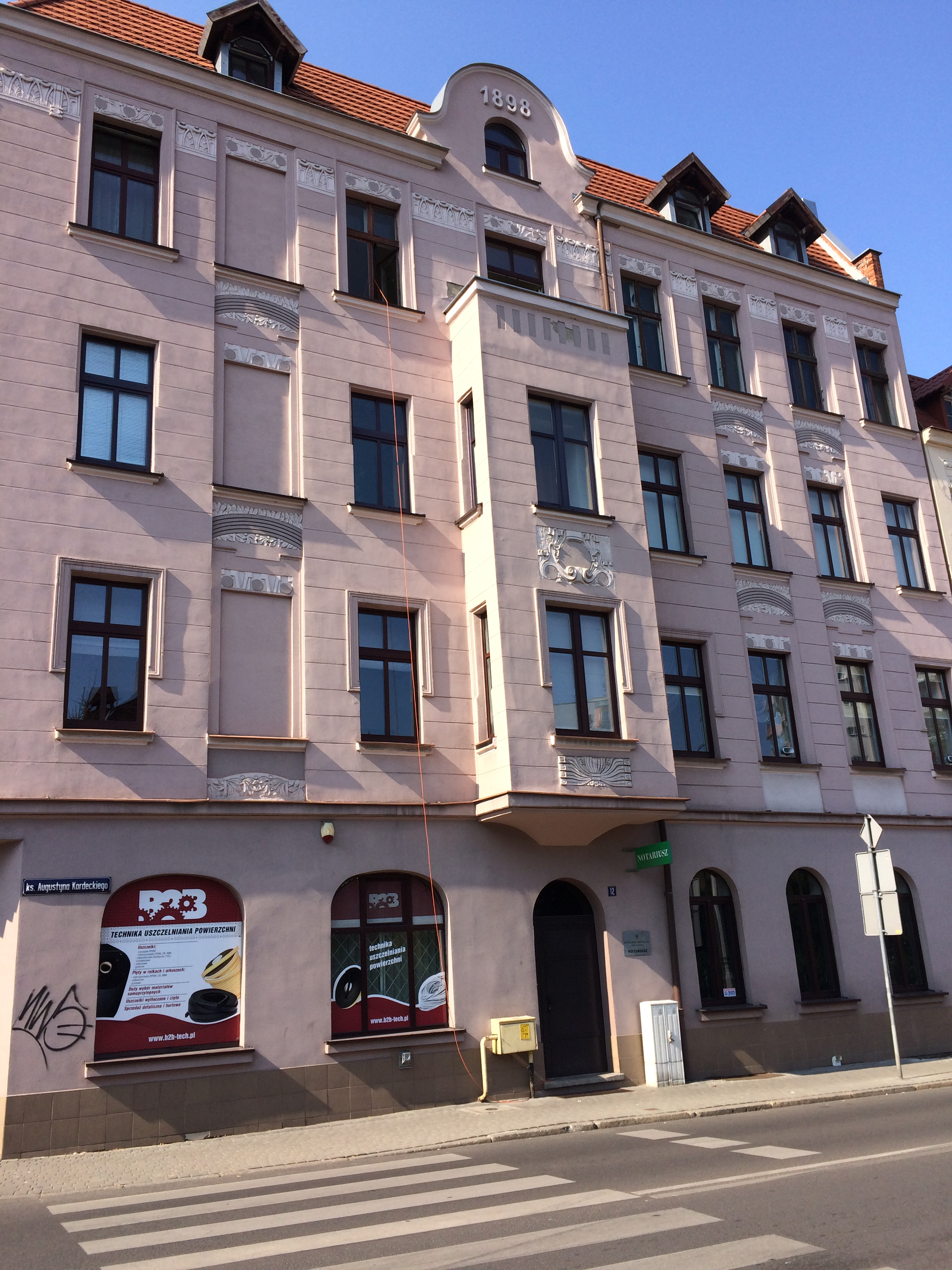
Facade on Kordeckiego street

Buildings that follow are located in the historical part of the street, then named Cichorein straße with its own house numbering.

=== Emil ßohl tenement at 13 Kordeckiego ===
1905

Eclecticism, elements of Art Nouveau

Emil ßohl, the first landlord, ran there a business selling alcohol-free beverages. His special was the champagne-weiße (white champagne without alcohol). At the time, the building was registered at 1 Cichorien straße.

Although the main frontage displays a neo-classical style, one can be surprised to discover a gorgeous Art Nouveau decor beneath the oriel window, featuring women figures, apple tree and other floral motifs.

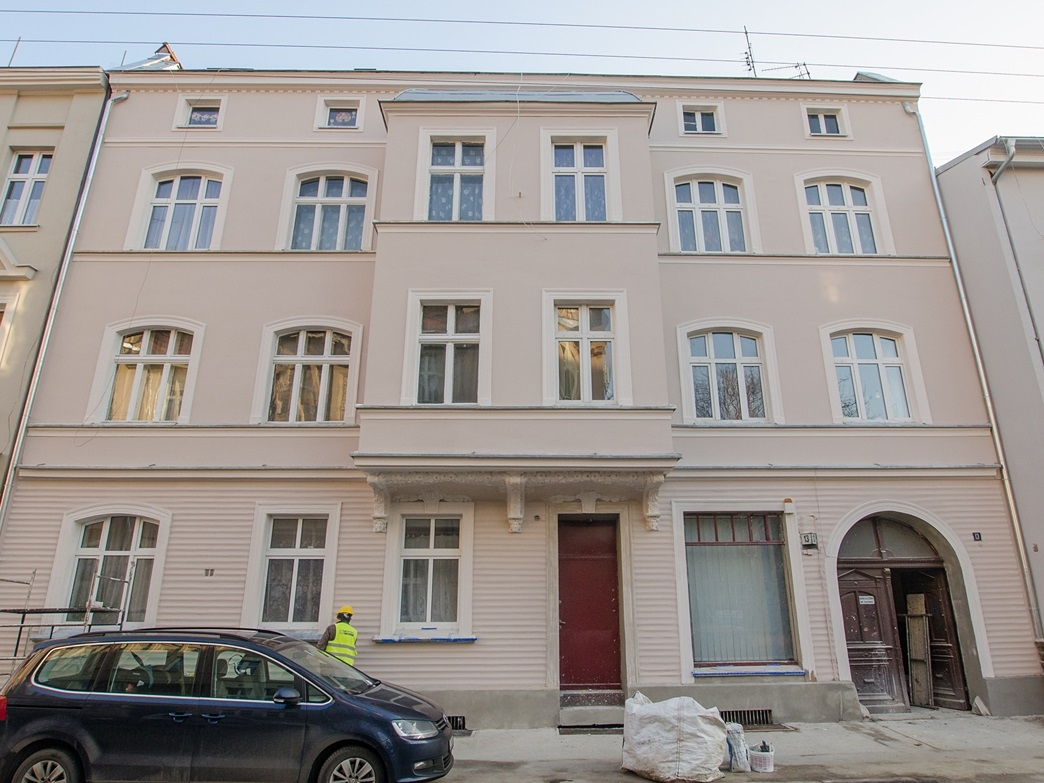
Main frontage

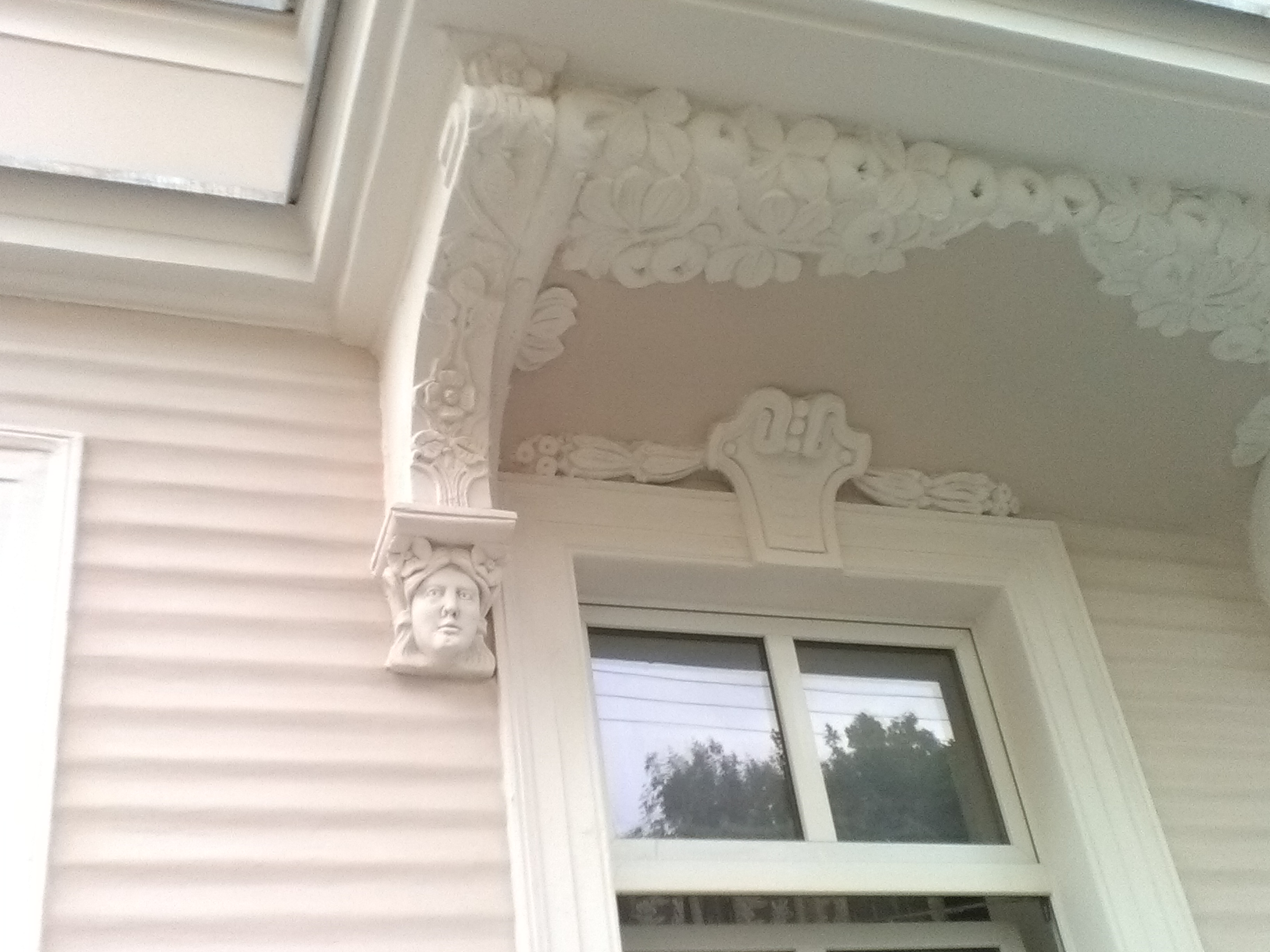
Art Nouveau motifs

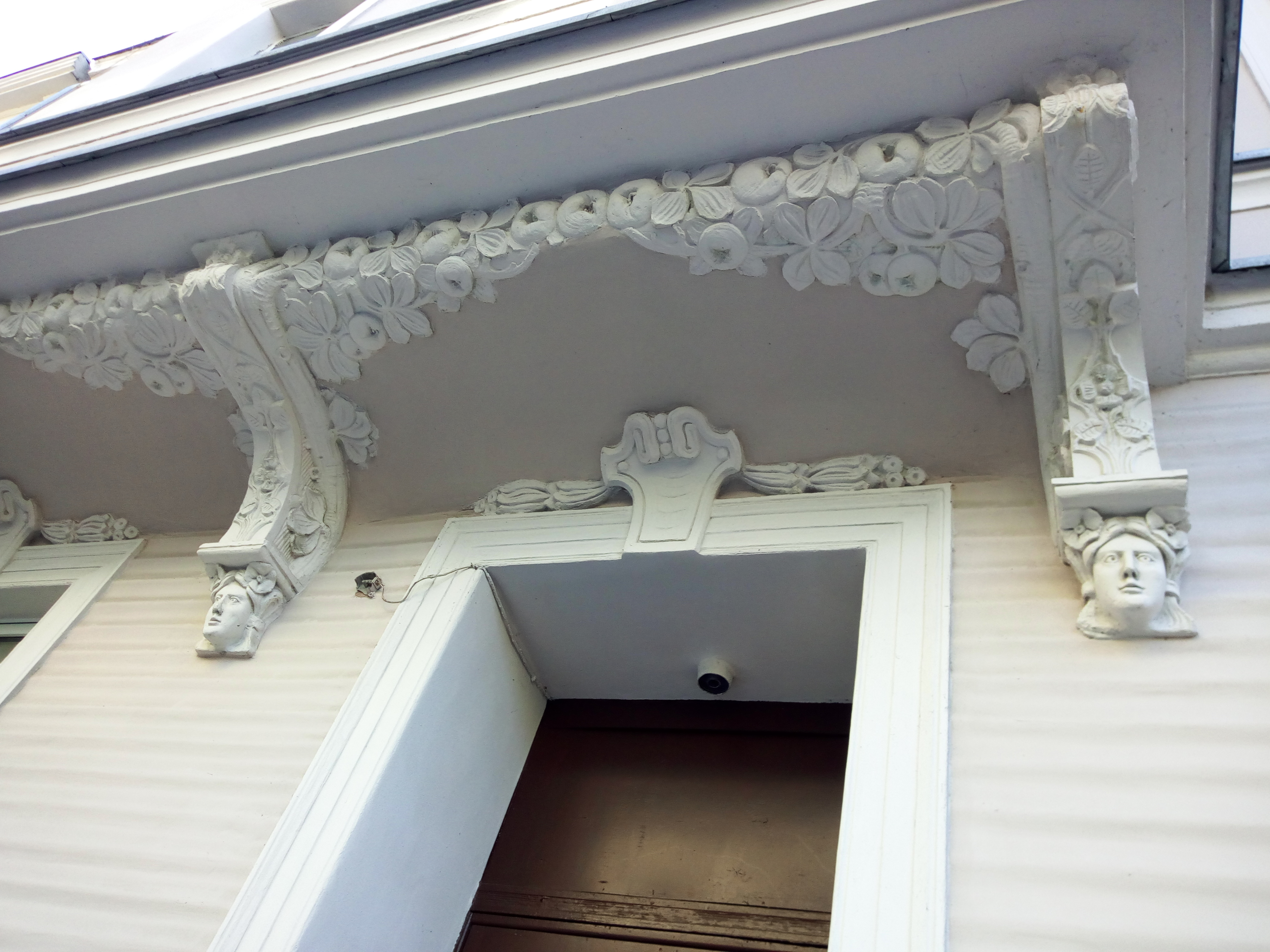
Art Nouveau motifs

=== Tenement at 14, corner with 29 Swiętej Trojcy street ===
Registered on Kuyavian-Pomeranian Voivodeship Heritage List, Nr.722476 Reg A/1389, October 6, 2008

1910

Art Nouveau, Vienna Secession

The house, initially at Berliner straße 7, was co-owned by Heinrich Kori, a Berlin engineer, and the widow of Rudolph Kori, a lawyer in Leipzig. In 1910, the building moved to the hands of the Wedell brothers, Carl (a geometer) and Paul (a merchant): it remained in the Wedell family until the outbreak of World War II.

The tenement boasts two facades of magnificent Art Nouveau architectural style, recently renovated in 2016. One can underline the corner bay window, overhanging the entrance, ornamented with stuccos depicting two blooming trees. On both facades, a multitude of adorned motifs recall the late Secession style, echoing the Grawunder brothers' tenements erected at Dworcowa Street 45/47 during the same period.

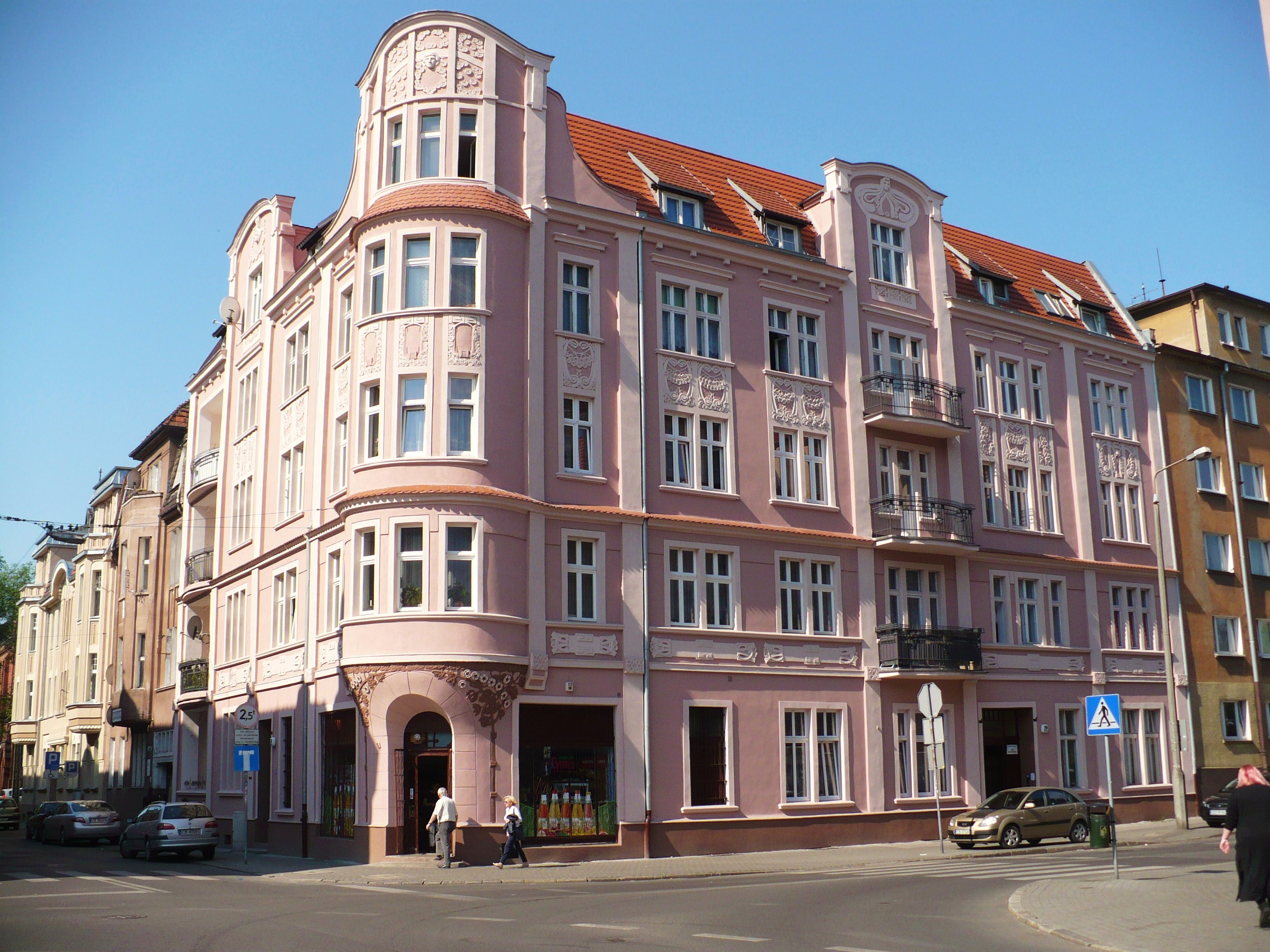
View from streets intersection

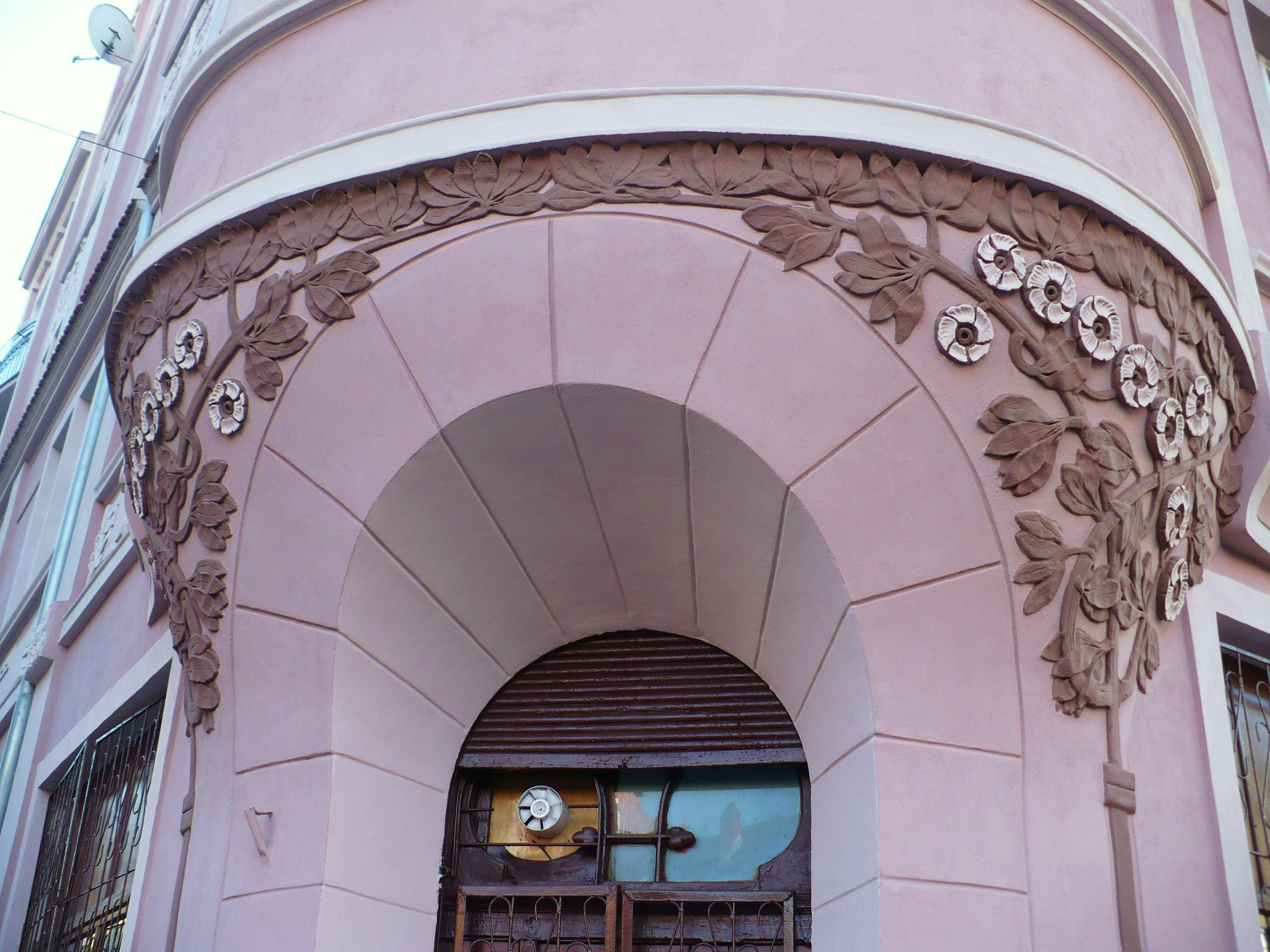
Decoration detail

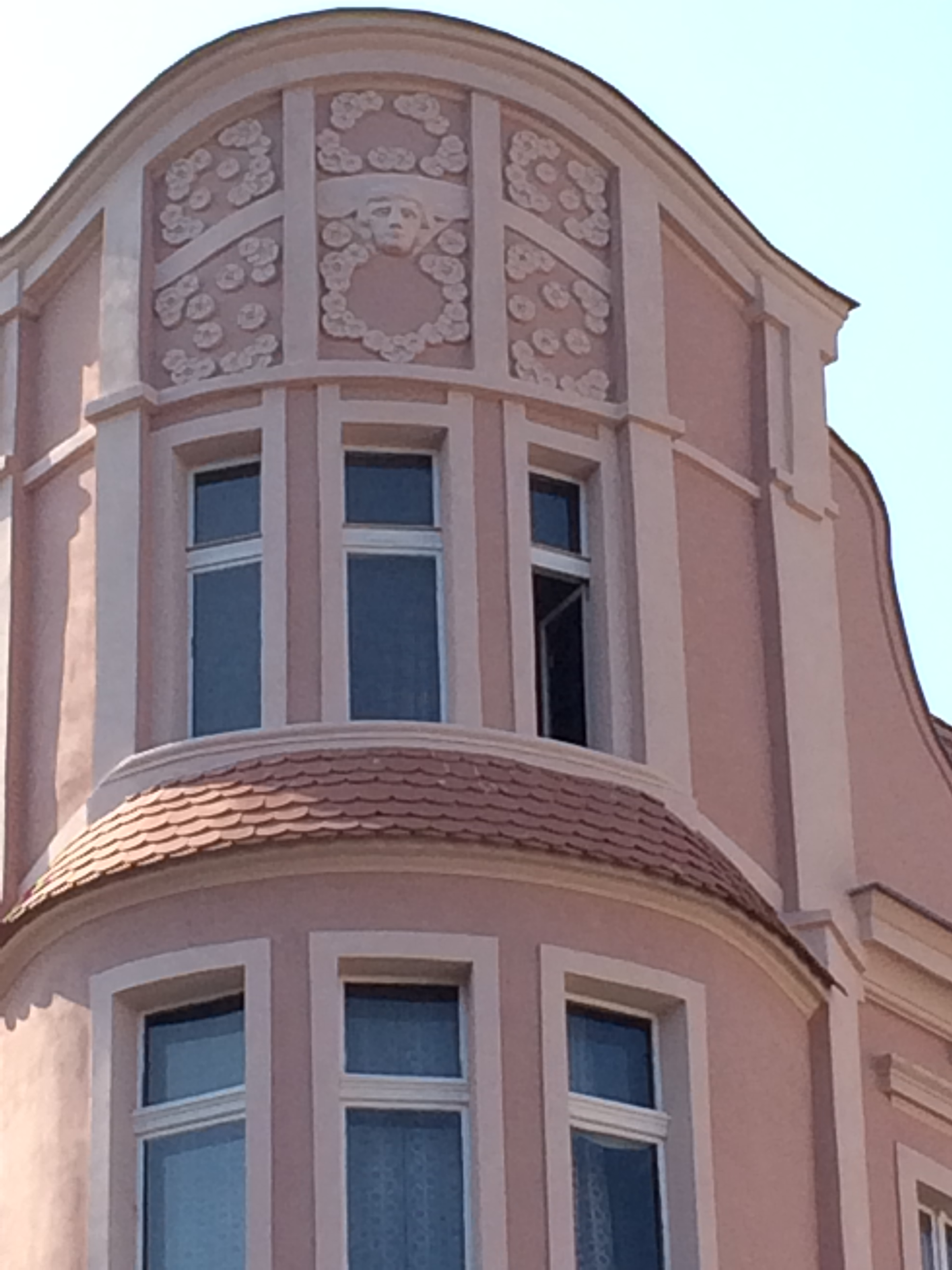
Gable motifs

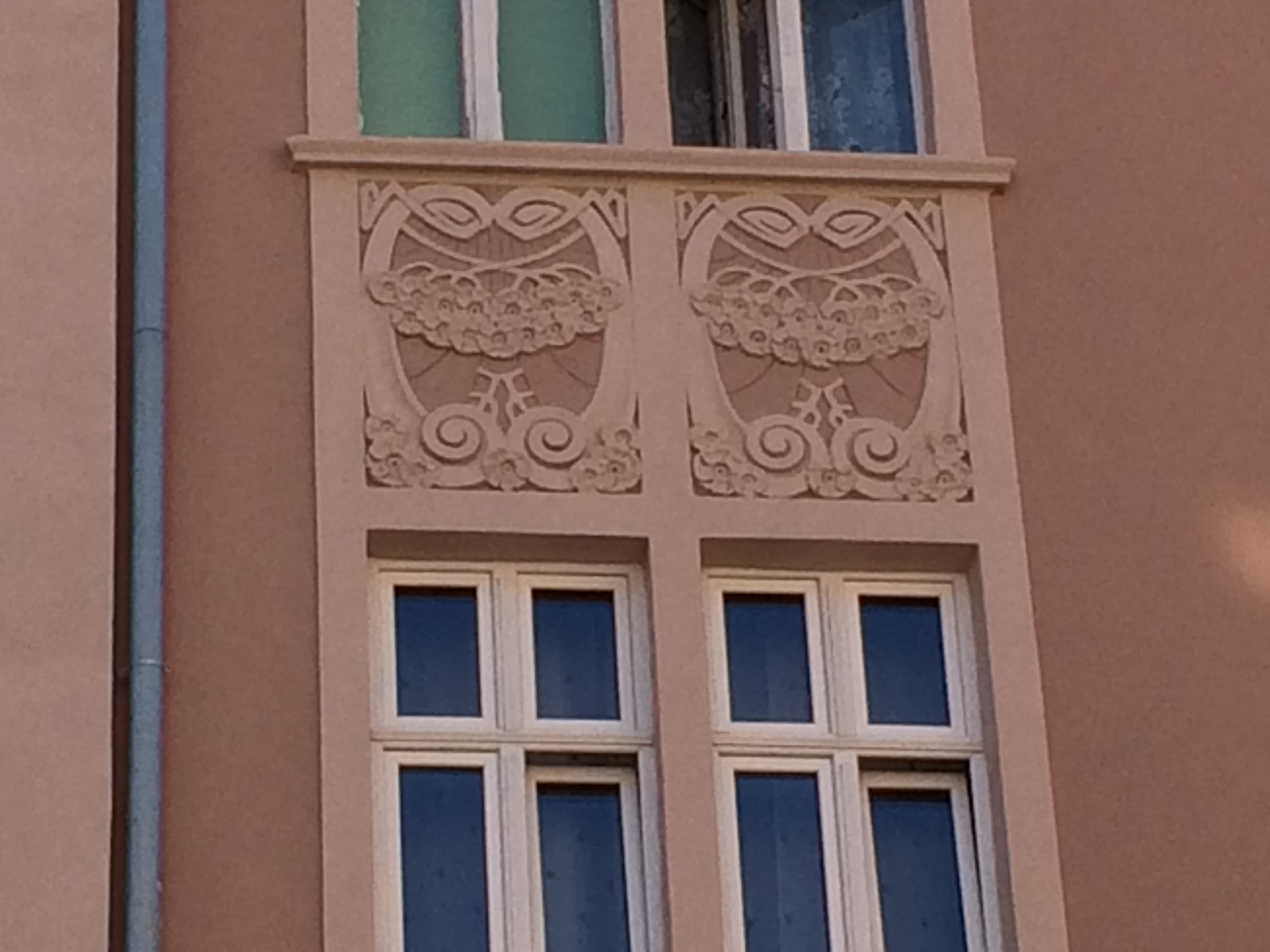
Cartouche

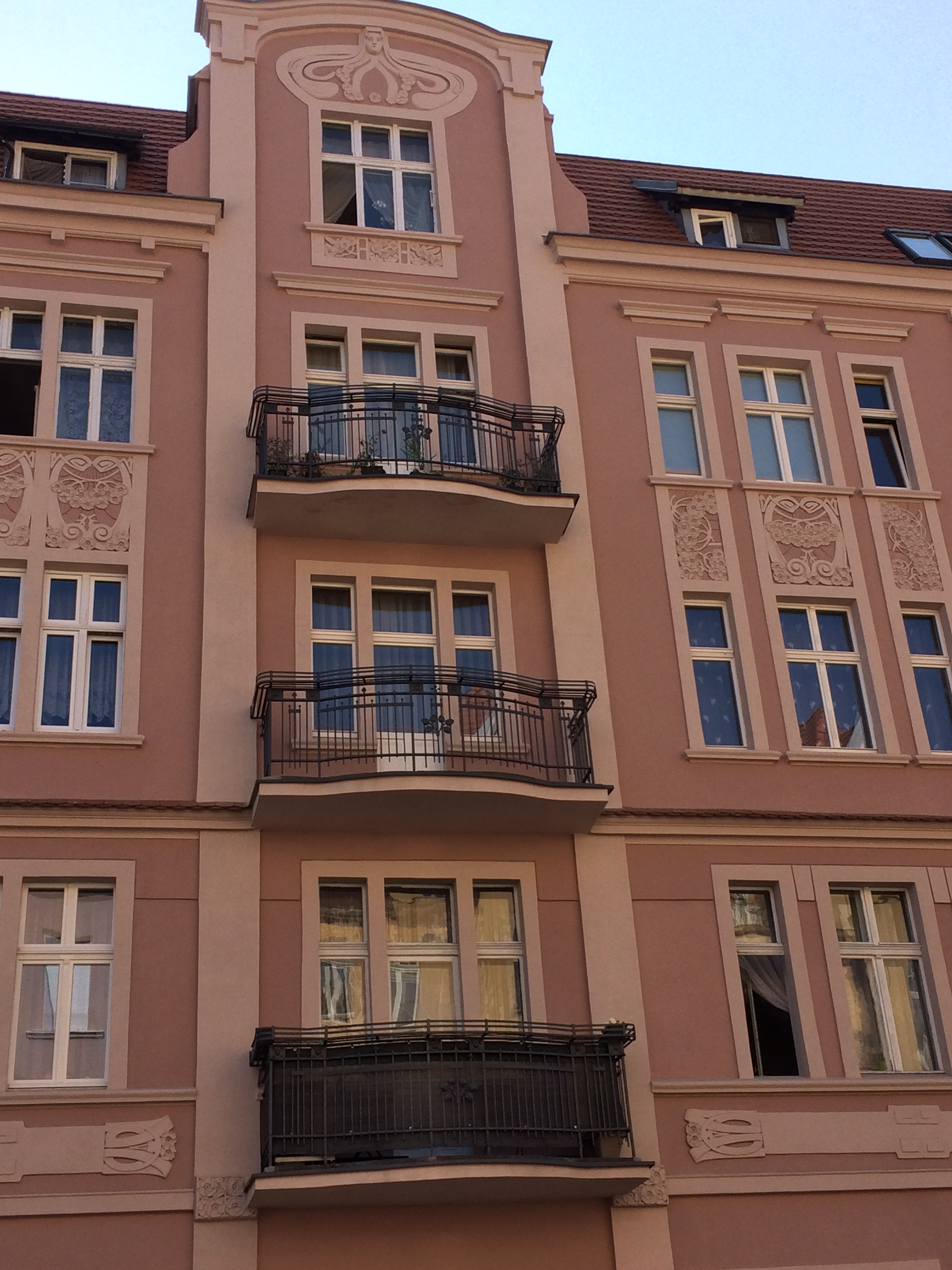
Elevation on Świętej Trojcy street

=== Tenement at 15 ===
1875-1900

Eclecticism

One of the oldest buildings in the street, with an owner dating back to 1878 (Mr Lehman, a rentier) at this place then registered as 2 Cichorien straße.

The tenement has been restored in 2016–2017.

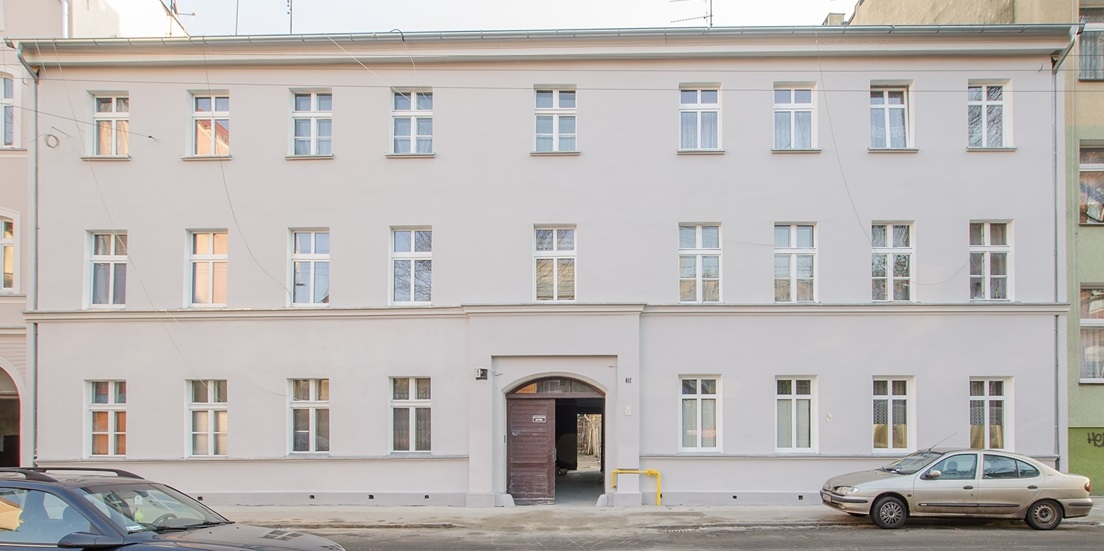
Main frontage

=== Tenement at 16 ===
1910, by Adalbert Rennwanz

Art Nouveau

Few elements are known about the commissioner of this building: the first owner was Mr Herman, who did not live there.

Nice Art Nouveau facade, with some elements to be emphasized: cartouches on the canter bay window topped by a small terrace and a splendid portal flanked by truncated columns, adorned with a stuccoed kneeling figure and a large transom window.

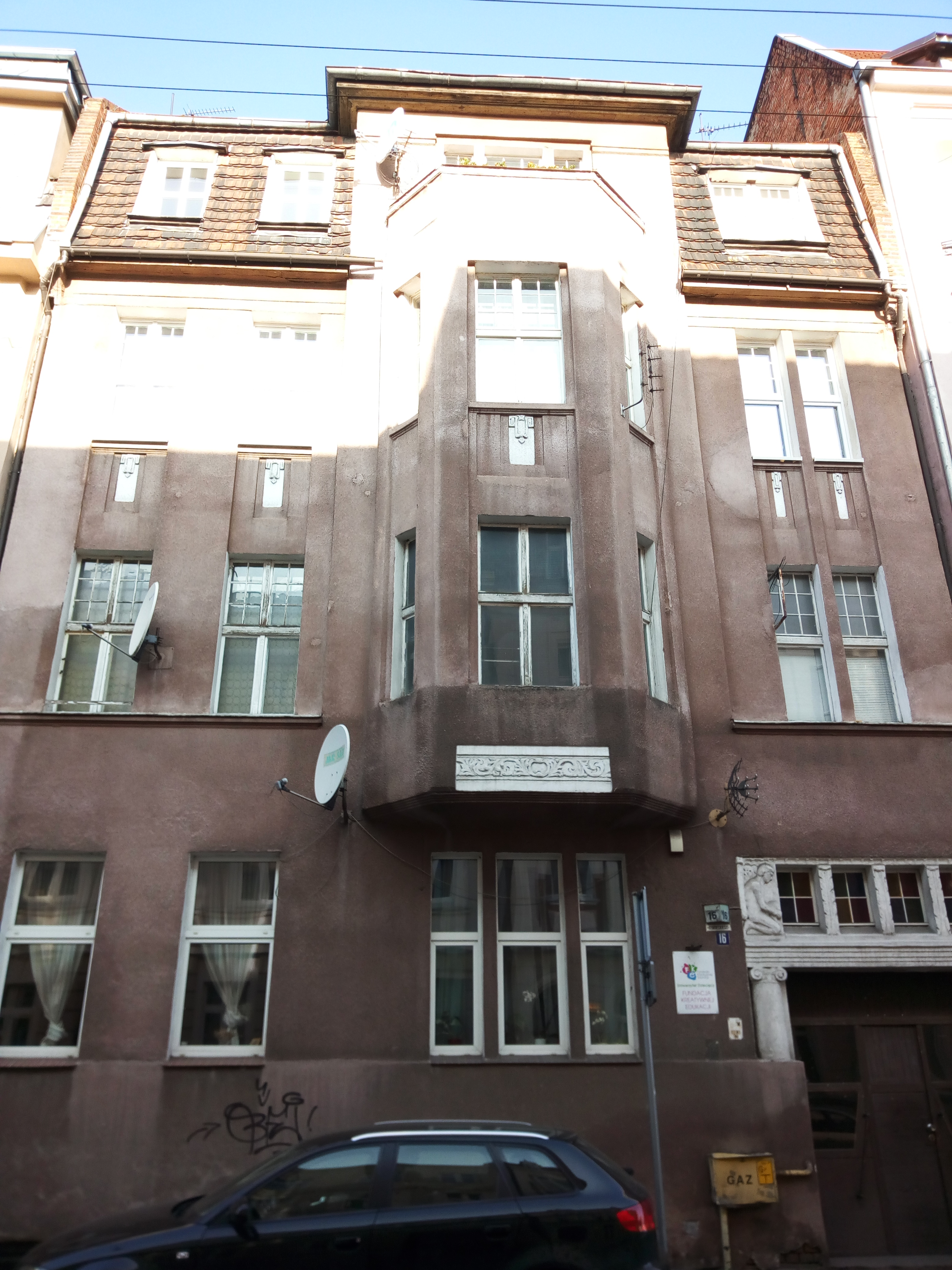
Main frontage

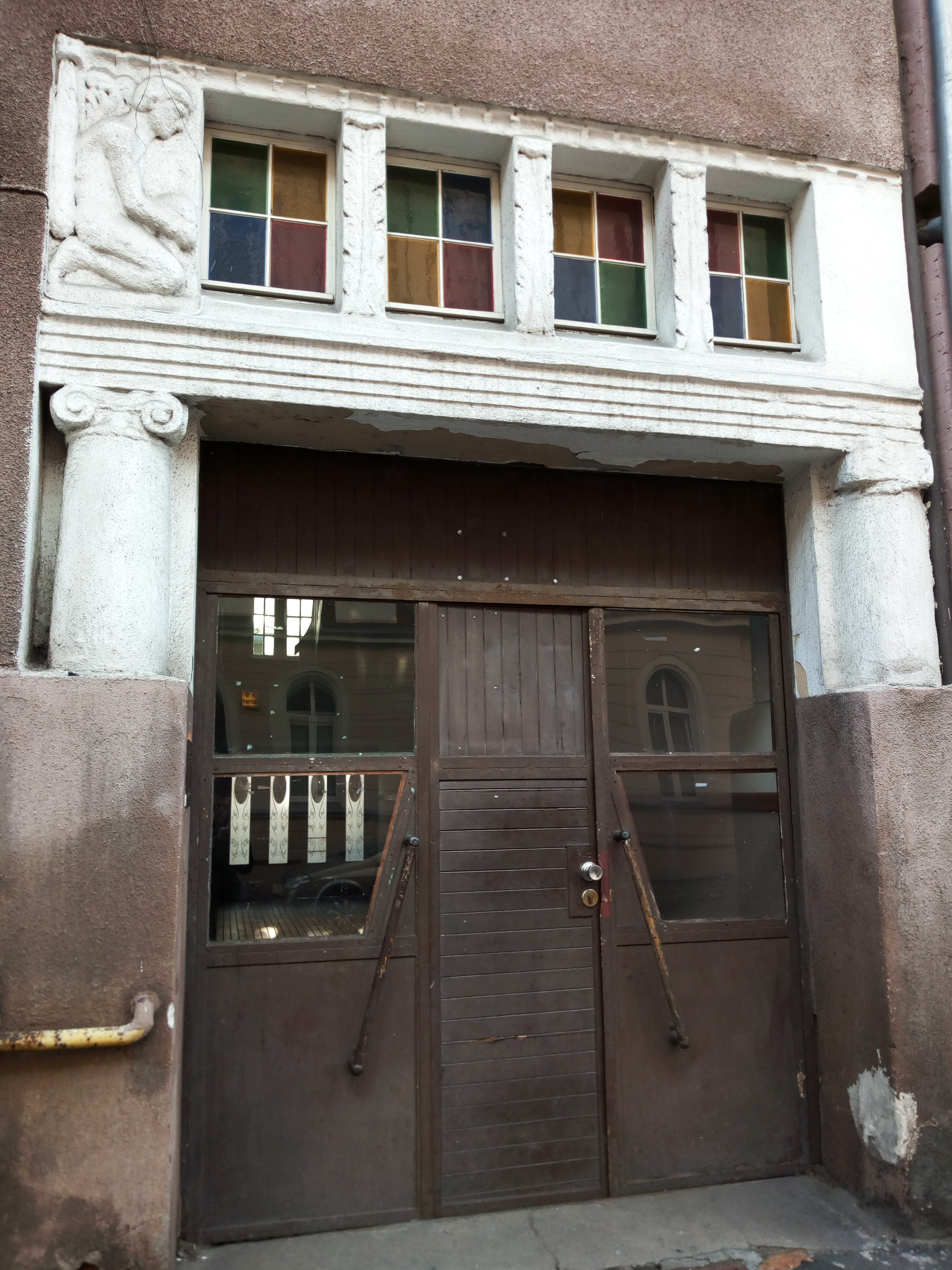
Portal and door

=== Tenement at 18 ===
Registered on Kuyavian-Pomeranian Voivodeship Heritage List, Nr.A/1599, October 13, 2011

1910, by Adalbert Rennwanz

Art Nouveau

Prior to this building, at the turn of the 20th century, stood there a house owned by Friedrich Hoffmeister, a bailiff. A pharmacist, Franz Brüche, bought it back and had the current tenement erected.

Renovated in 2018, the frontage is balanced by two canter bay windows topped by a terrace. The main door is gorgeously ornamented with stucco elements, as well as the facade gable extending over it. A dentil runs on top of the elevation.

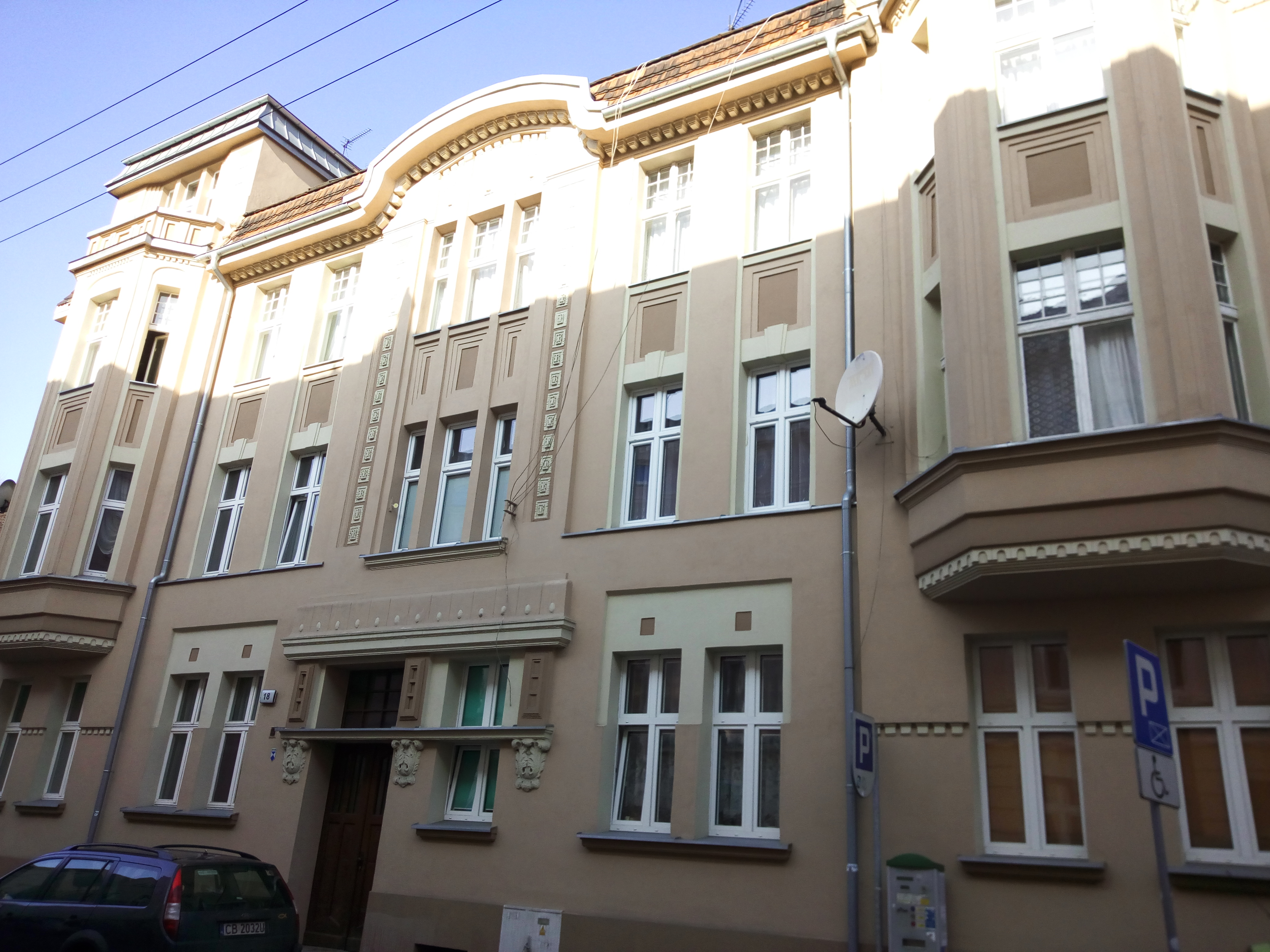
Facade on the street

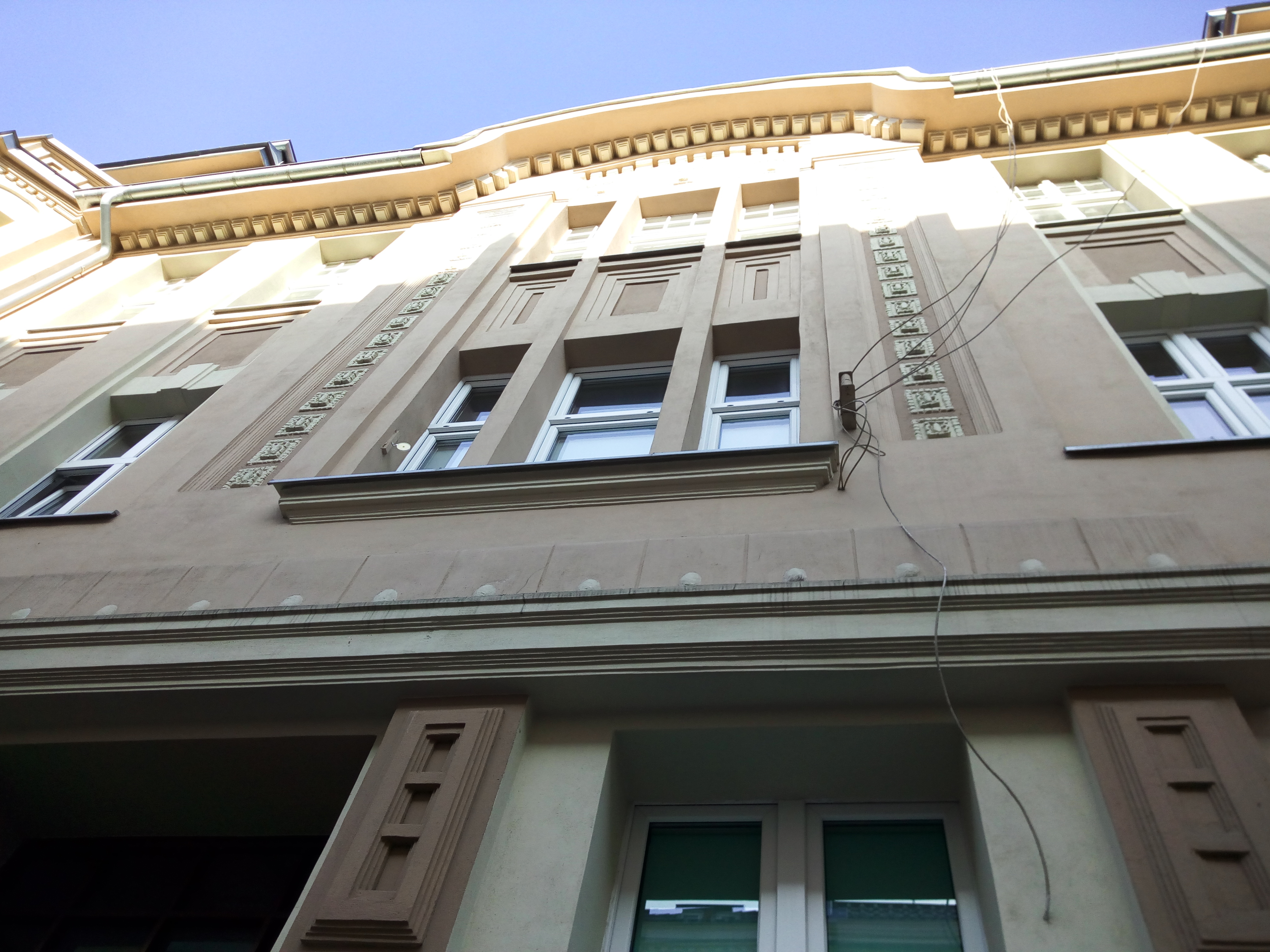
Detail of the facade

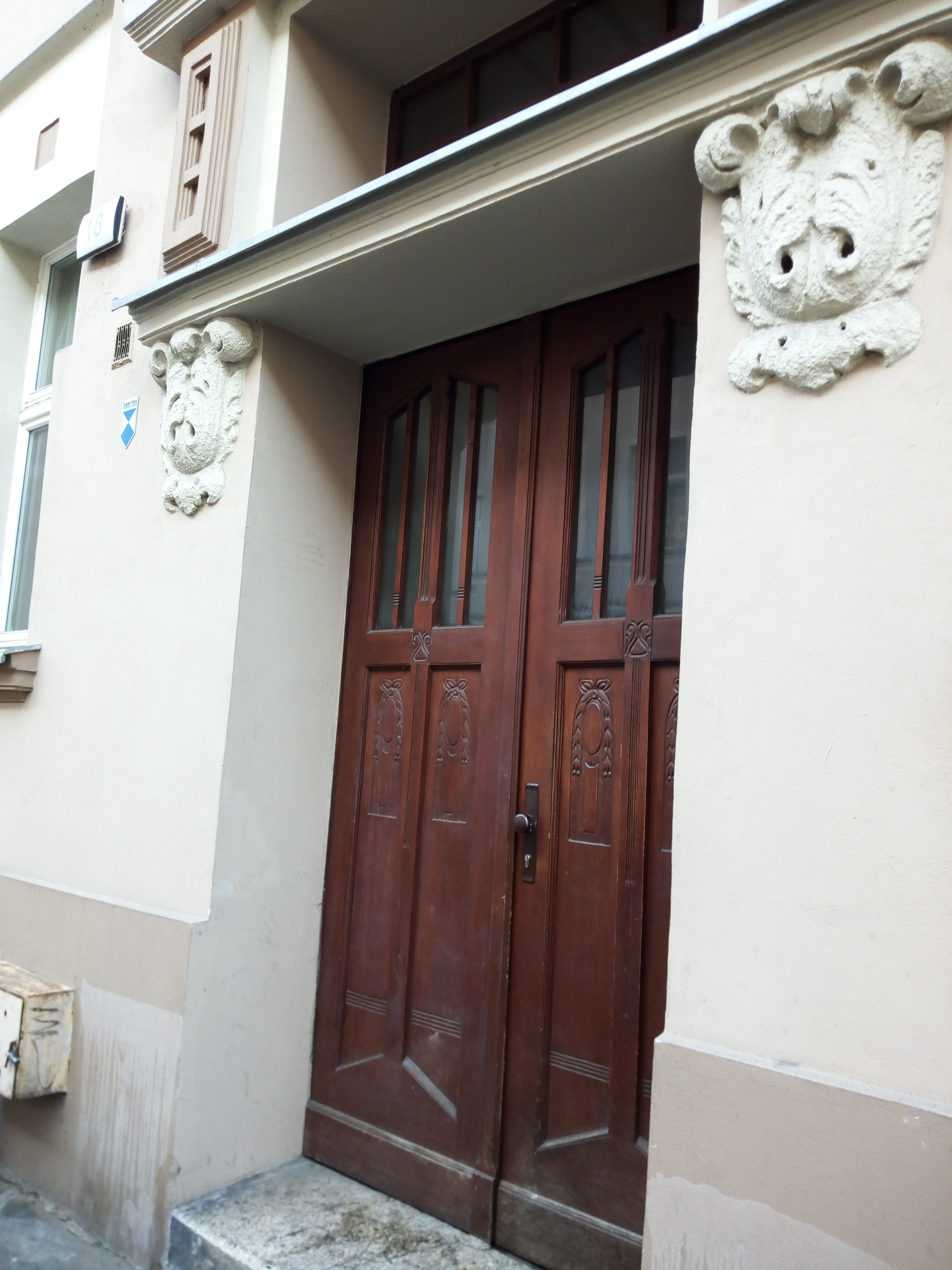
Portal and door

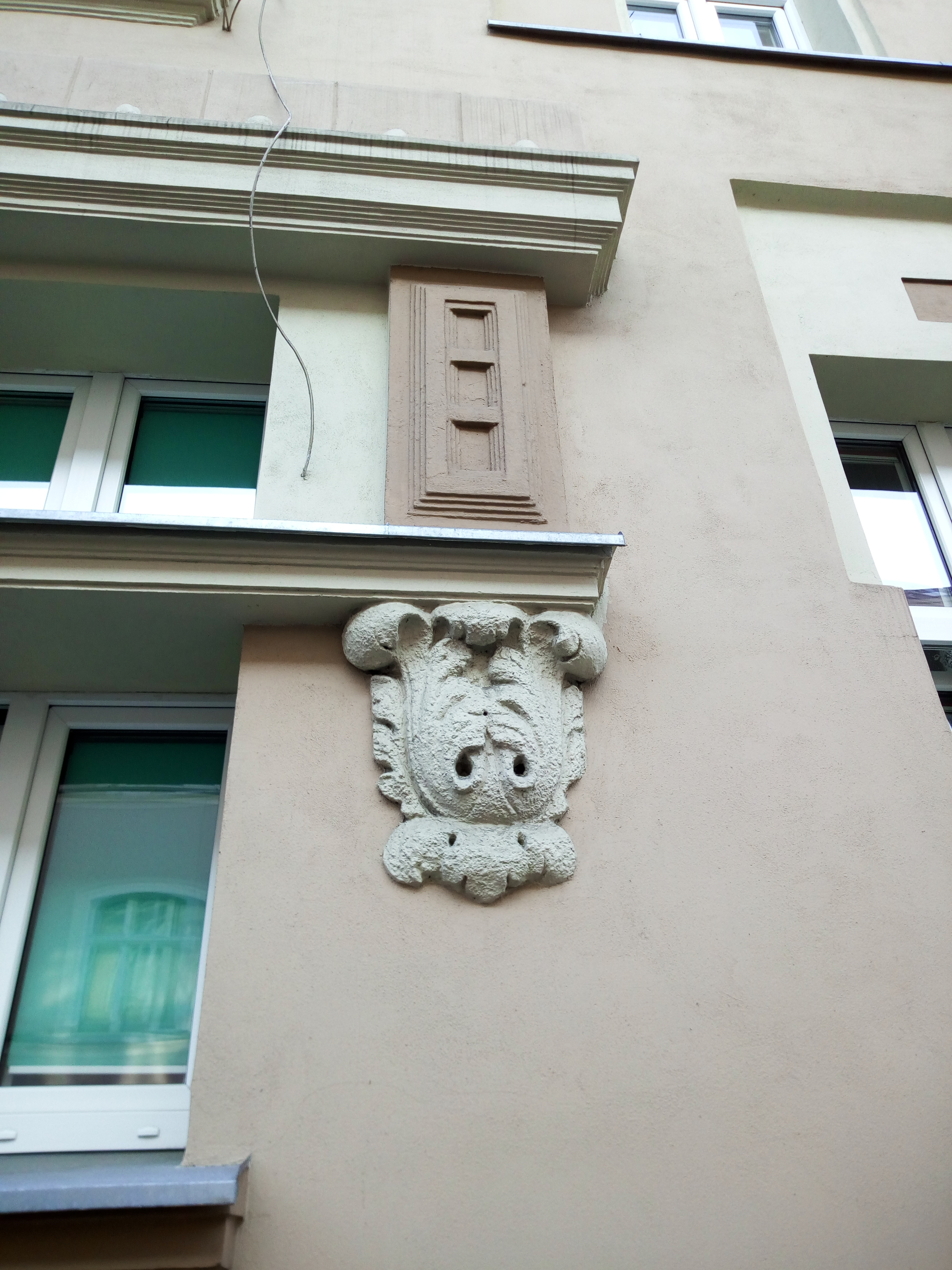
Stucco element

=== Villa at 19 ===
1912, by Alfred Schleusener

Art Nouveau

Alfred Schleusener, a Bromberg architect, designed the project in 1908. It recalls some of his realisations in the city (Alfred Schleusener Tenement, 7 20 Stycznia 1920 Street).

Renovated in mid-2016, the villa decoration uses stucco motifs: from the columns flanking the door to the cartouches between windows to the festoons on the wall gable. Wood for the balcony or wrought iron on the railing are also utilised.

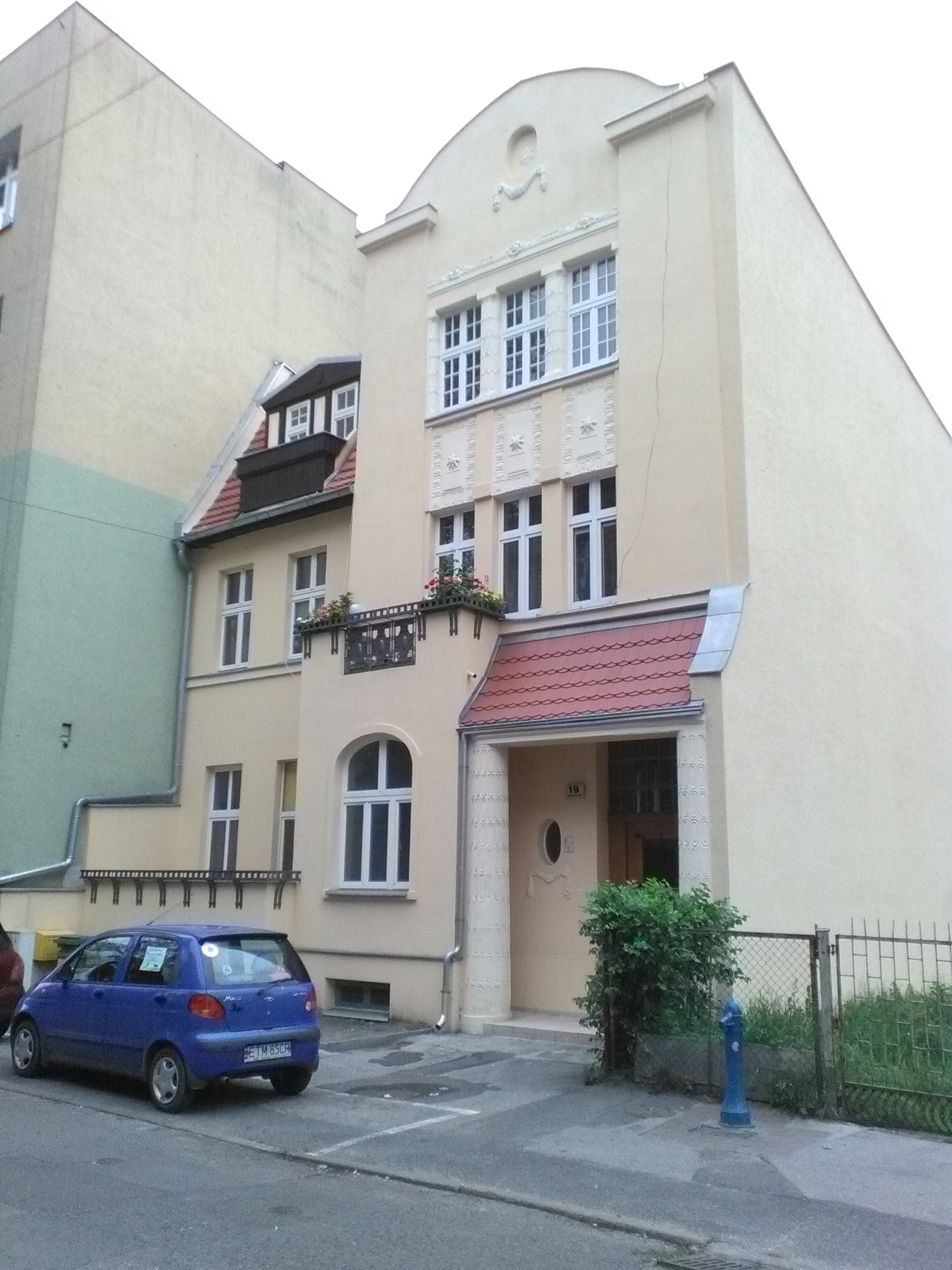
View from the street

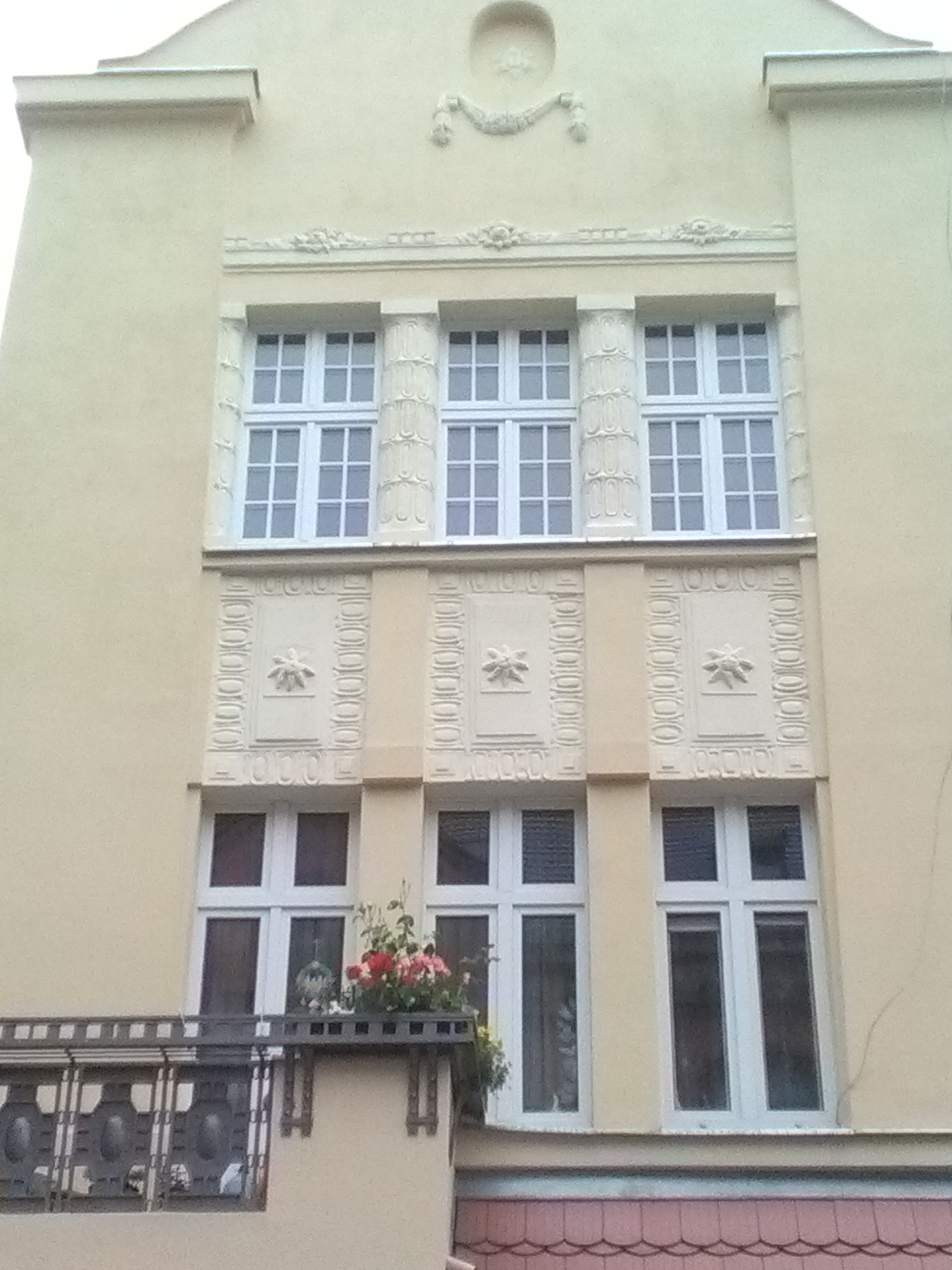
Detail of the facade

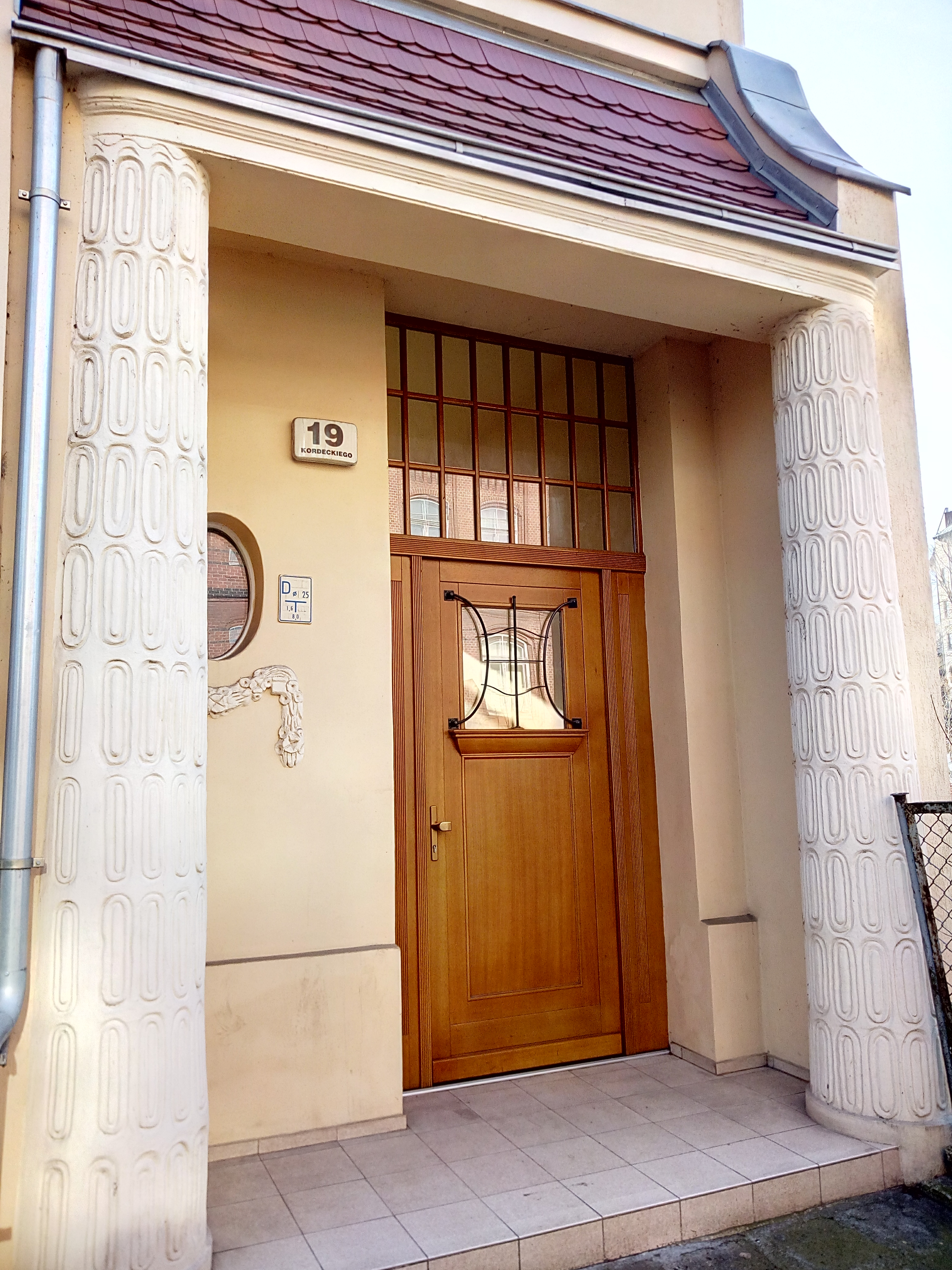
Portal and door

=== Building of the UTP, at 20 ===
Registered on Kuyavian-Pomeranian Voivodeship Heritage List, Nr.601368 A/337/1-2, September 30, 1992

1880s, by Carl Meyer

Neo-Gothic architecture

The building was erected at the end of the 19th century as the seat of dual primary schools for girls and boys, nicknamed Hippelschule after Hippel straße. Carl Meyer designed it, together with the adjacent sport hall at 22. During interwar period, the school, then named Holy Trinity, still taught girls and boys. It became co-educational school Nr.10 in 1925. At the end of WWII, the building had been housing a vocational school for several years before being handed over to the care of the University of Technology and Life Sciences in Bydgoszcz (Polish: Uniwersytet Technologiczno-Przyrodniczy-UTP) in the 1950s. On September 12, 1964, it was transformed into the High School of Engineering (Polish: Wyższa Szkoła Inżynierska) which initially ran the department of telecommunications and electrical engineering. Soon other domaines followed:

- a general engineering department with a mechanical and electrical faculty (1965);
- a department of chemical technology (1966);
- a civil engineering department (1967).

In 1968, the school was named after Jan and Jędrzej Śniadecki. In June 2020, the facility was purchased by the Polish Ministry of Defense.

The building has an elongated rectangle footprint, with wings extending in the back side. The three-floor edifice is covered with a gable hip roof and two ridge turrets topped by a finial. The front elevation displays two avant-corps where are located the entrances. Those have decorated lancet arched portals. Facades are adorned with friezes and cornices made of dark glazed brick

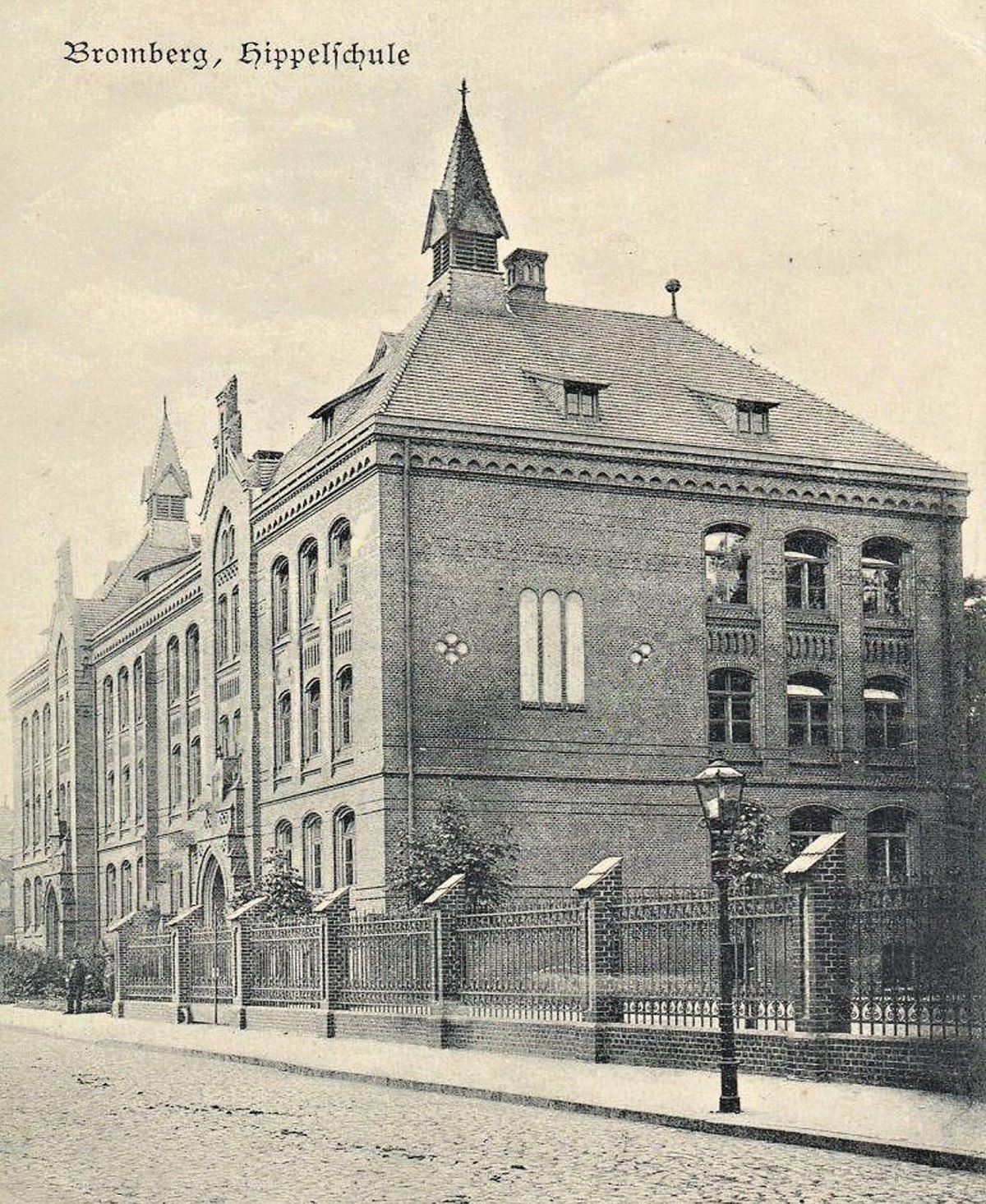
Hippelschule ca 1906

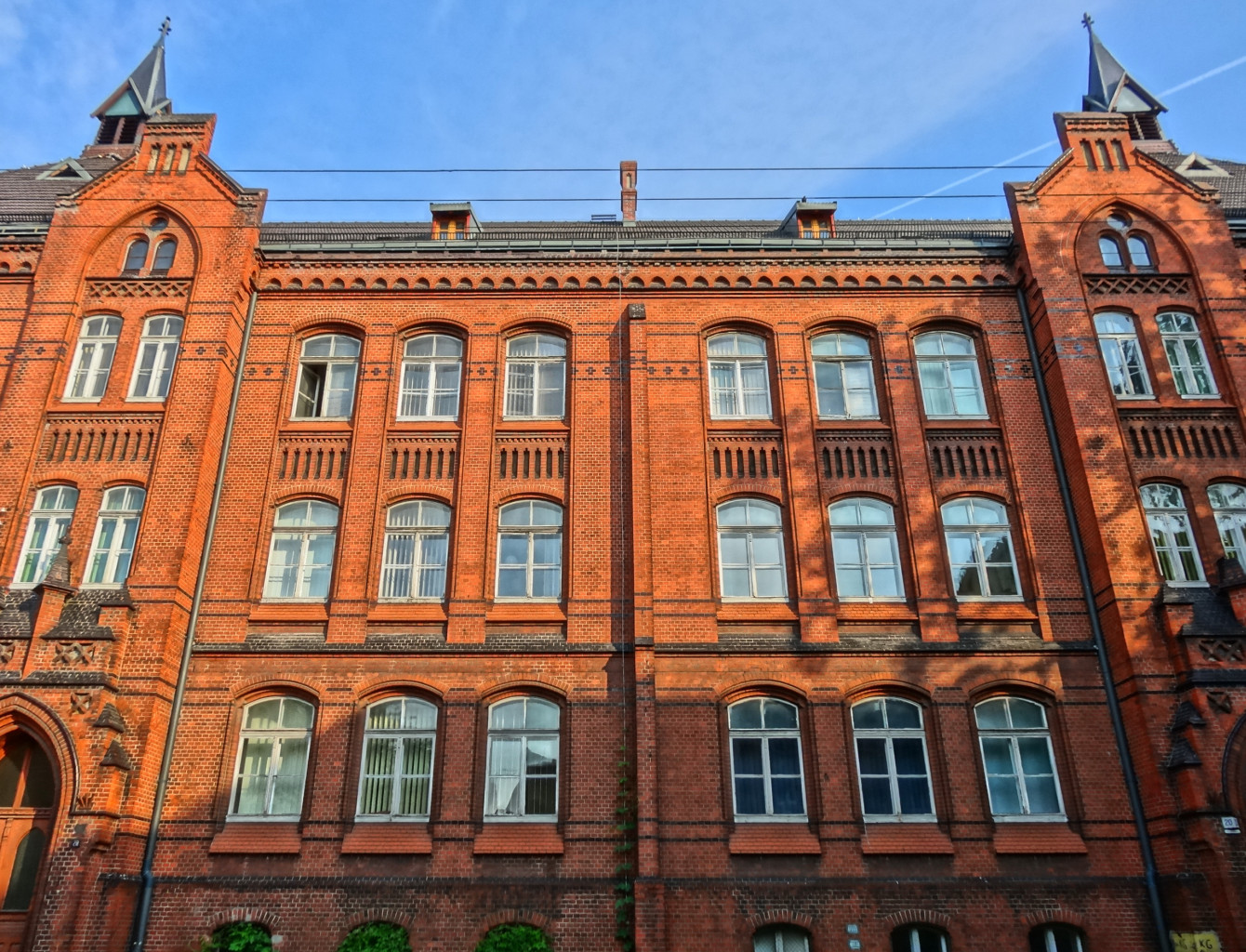
Main frontage on the street

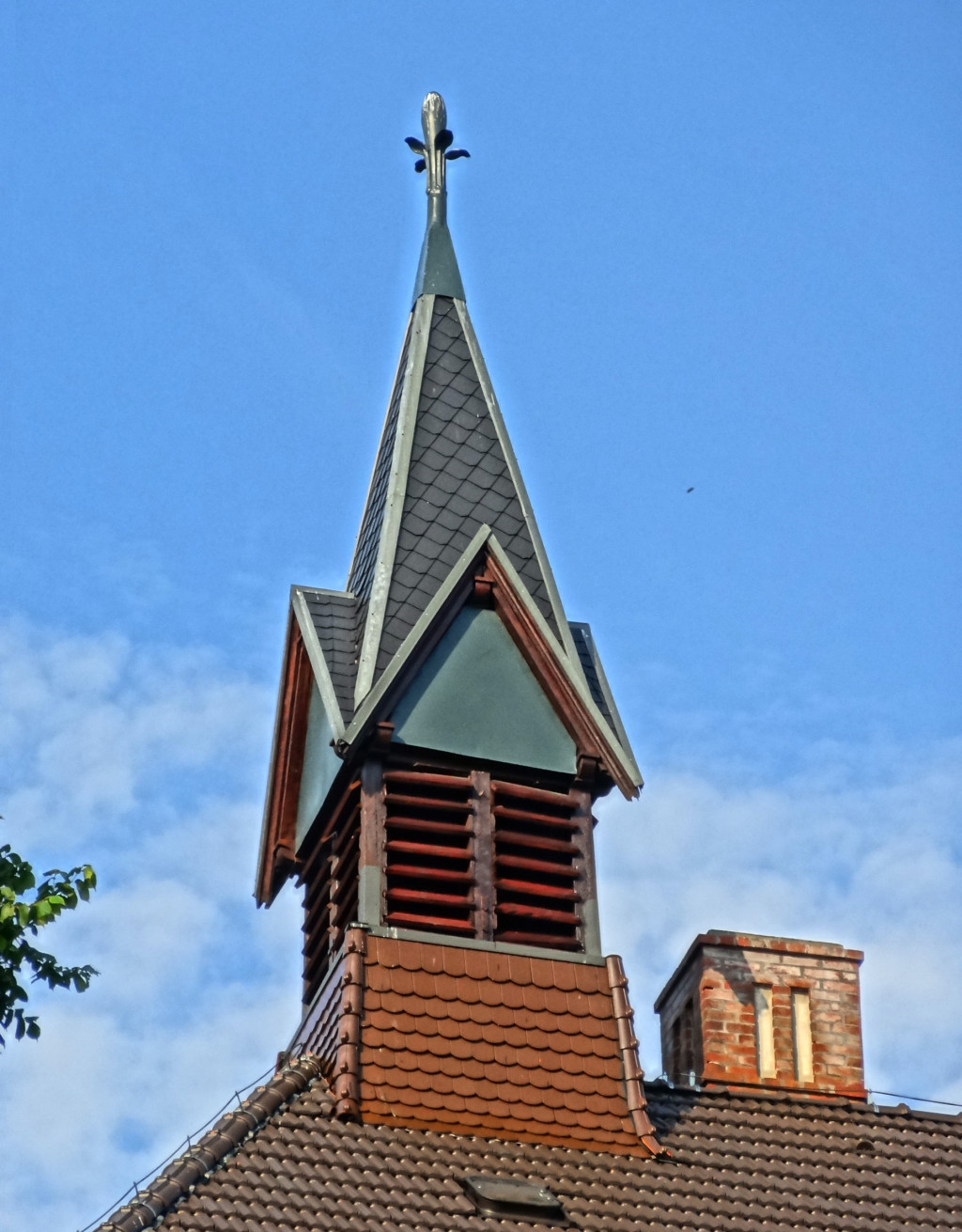
Ridge turret and finial

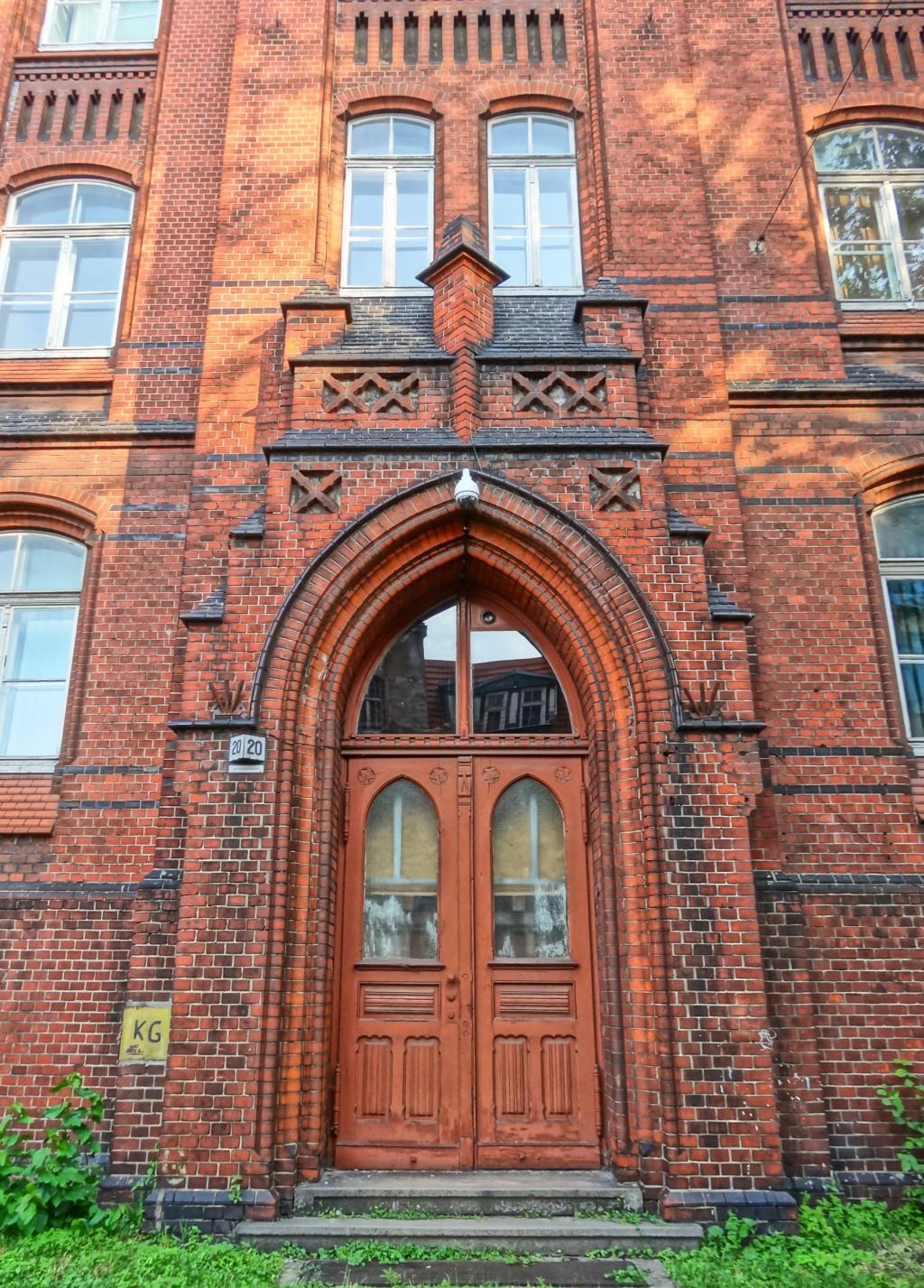
Portal and entrance

=== Gym house at 22 ===
Registered on Kuyavian-Pomeranian Voivodeship Heritage List, Nr.601369 A/337/1-2, September 30, 1992

1900-1902s, by Carl Meyer

Neo-Gothic architecture

Carl Meyer designed this gym hall following the same style as the one developed at N.20. This architecture recalls other gym buildings from this period in the city (e.g. at Gimnazjalna street or 4 Konarskiego Street).

Like at Nr.20, the neo-gothic edifice is garnished using glazed bricks, gothic-shaped windows and a ridge turret topped by a finial.

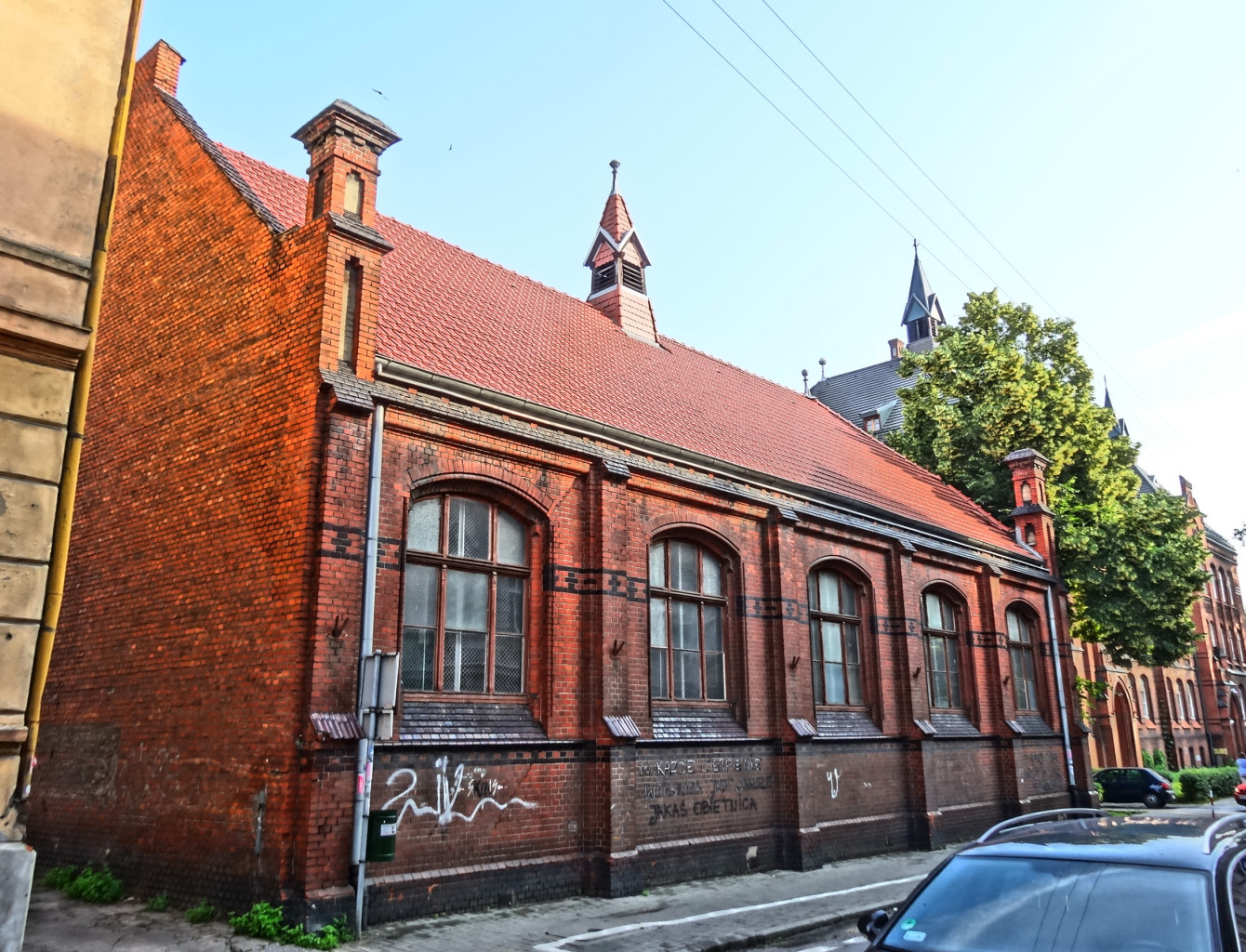
View from the street

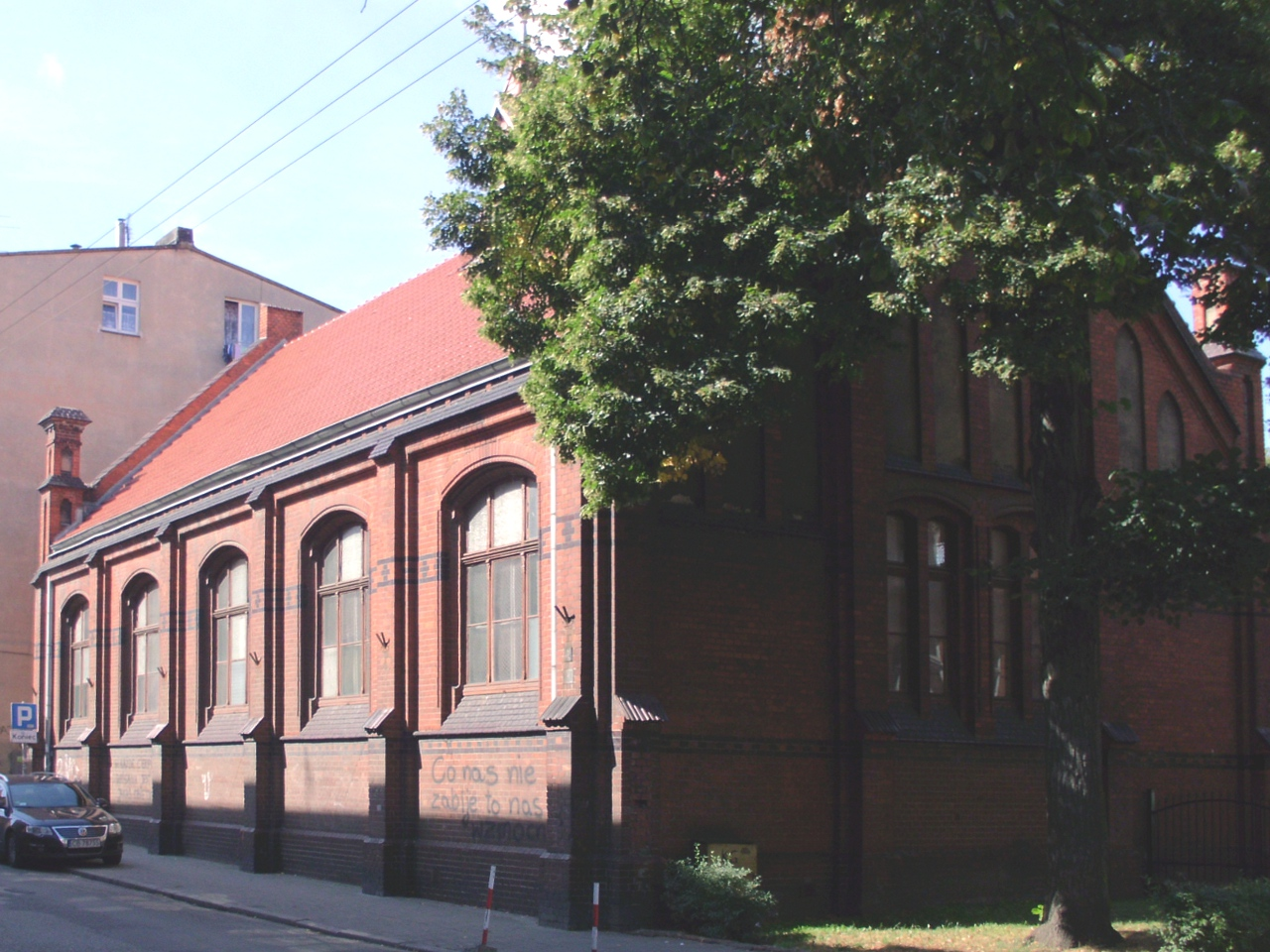
View from the street

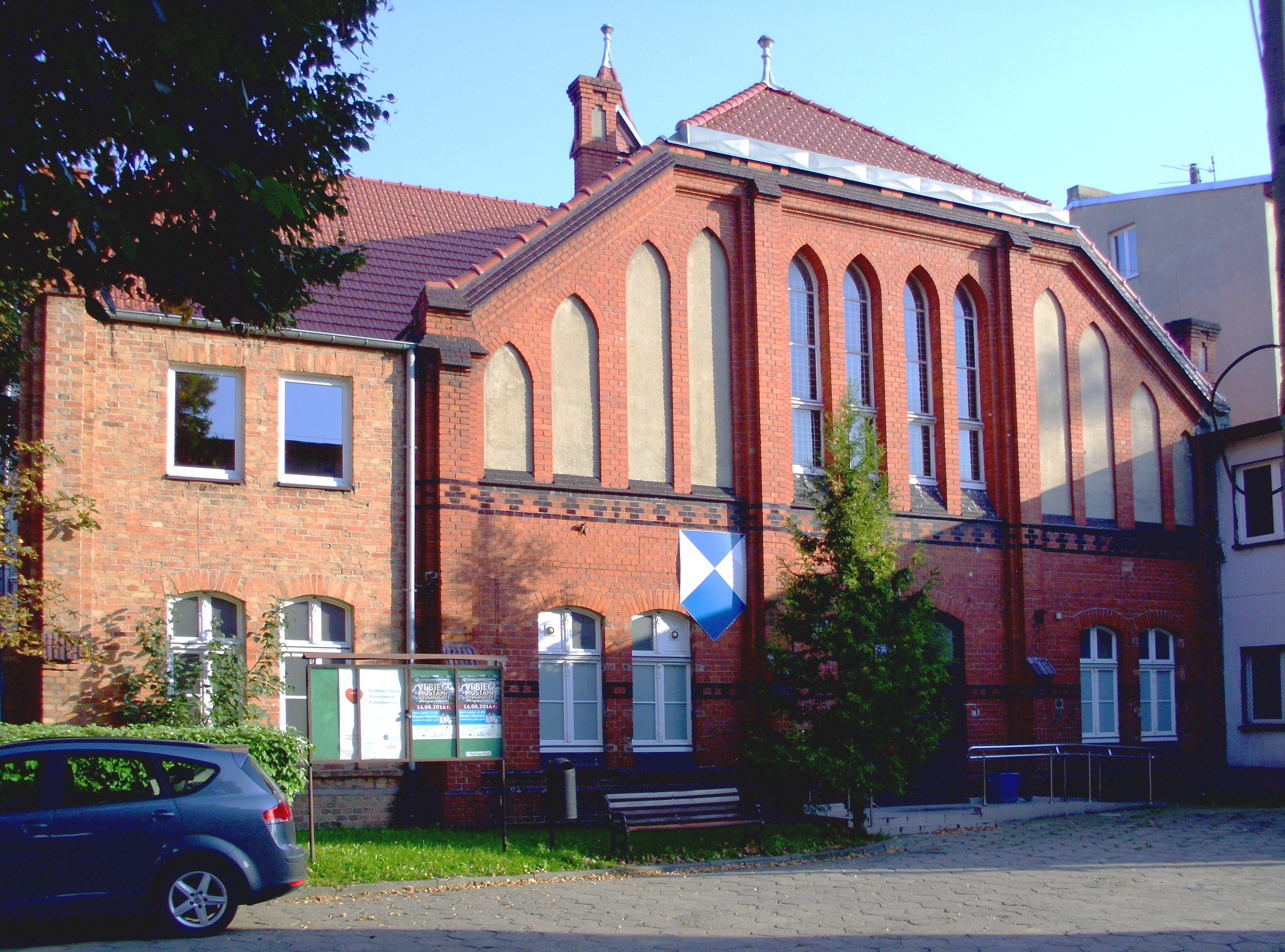
Entrance from the UTP side

=== Building at 23 ===
1912

Art Nouveau

Emil Zemisch, a relative of Artur living at Nr.8, was the first landlord of this building. He too ran a construction business till the outbreak of WWI.

Renovated in 2017, the edifice features Art Nouveau style, in particular in the details adorning the main door, the ground floor and top gable œil-de-bœufs or the stucco motifs on the bay window.

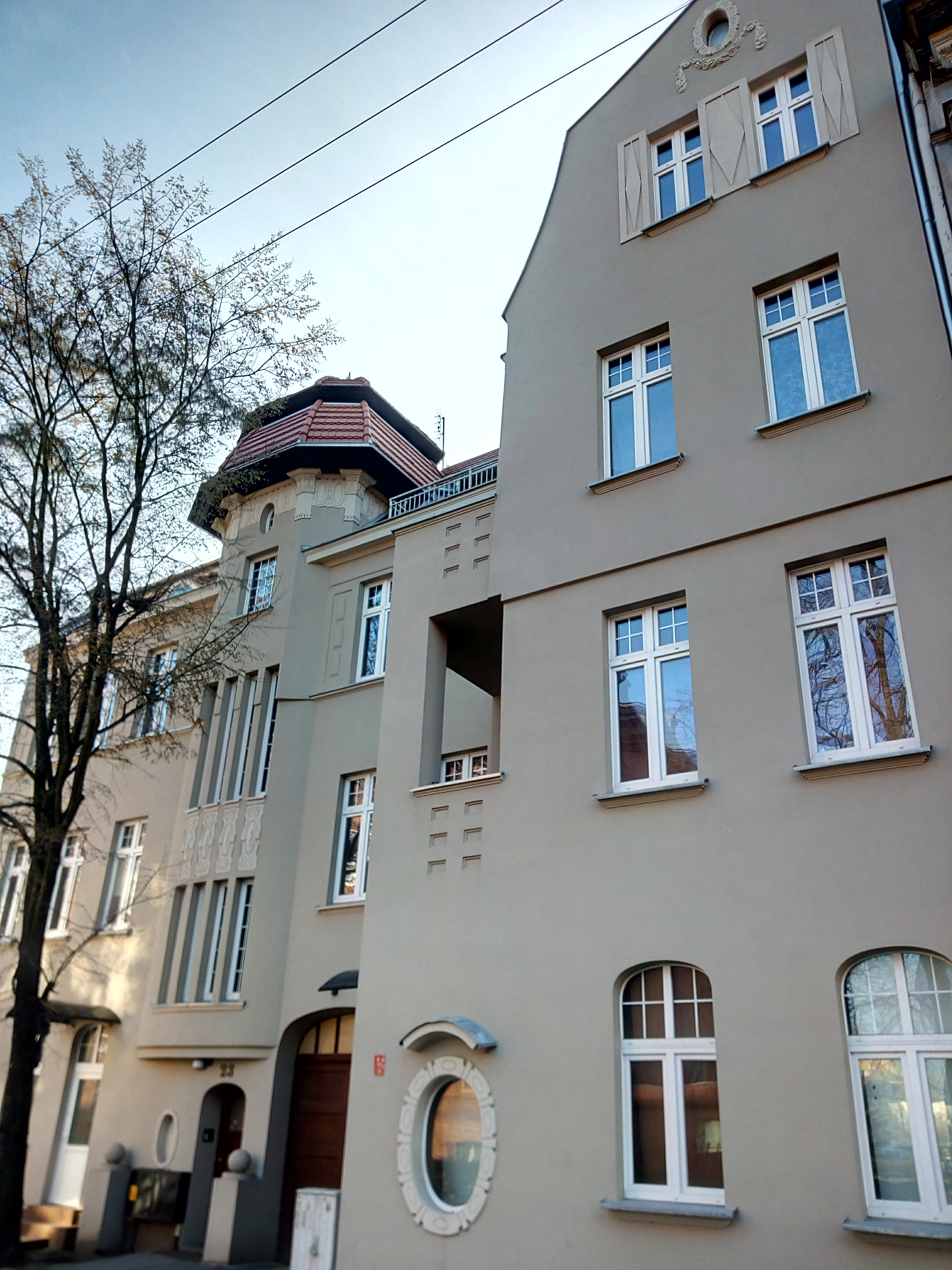
Frontage from the street

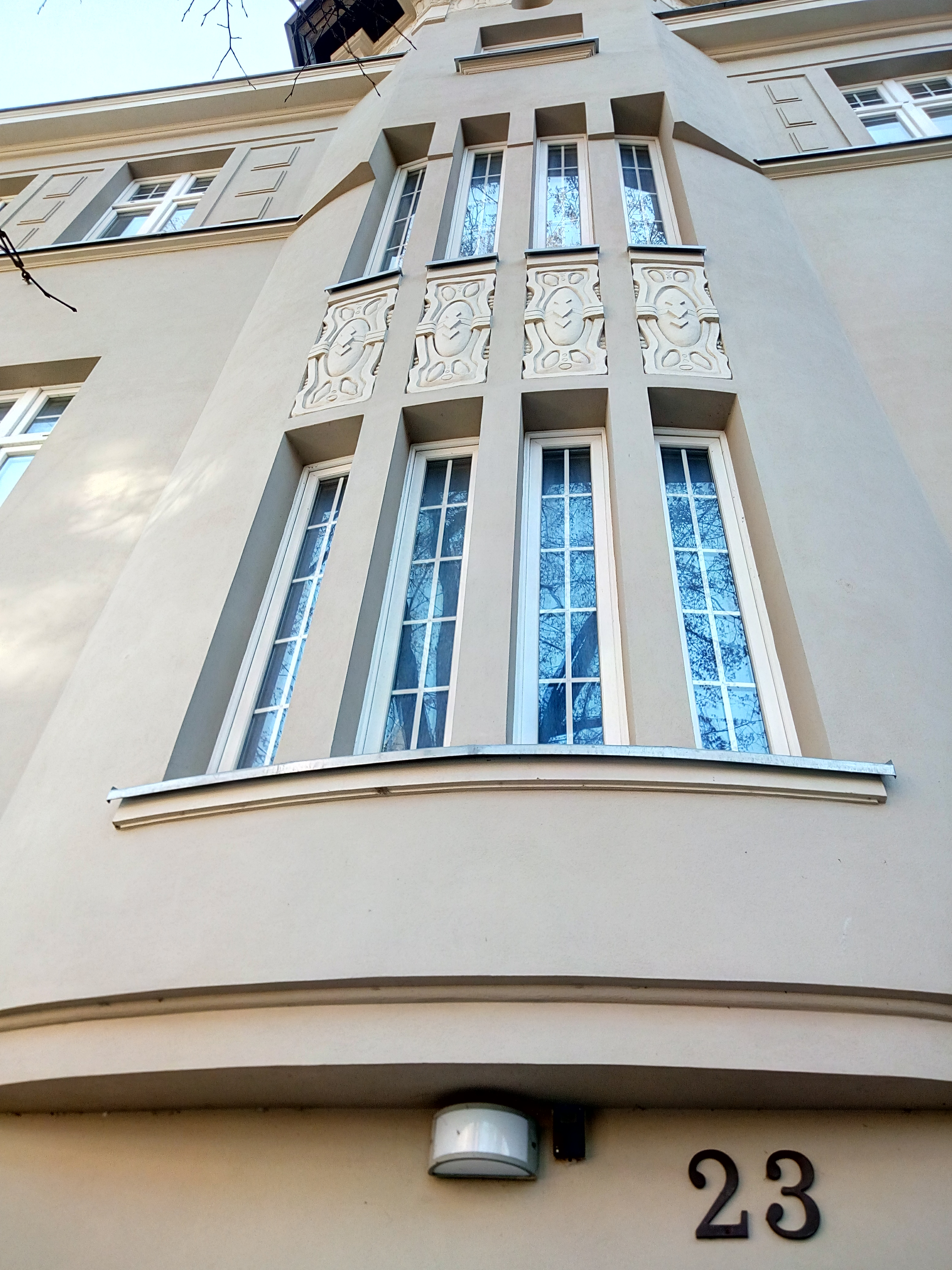
Bay window

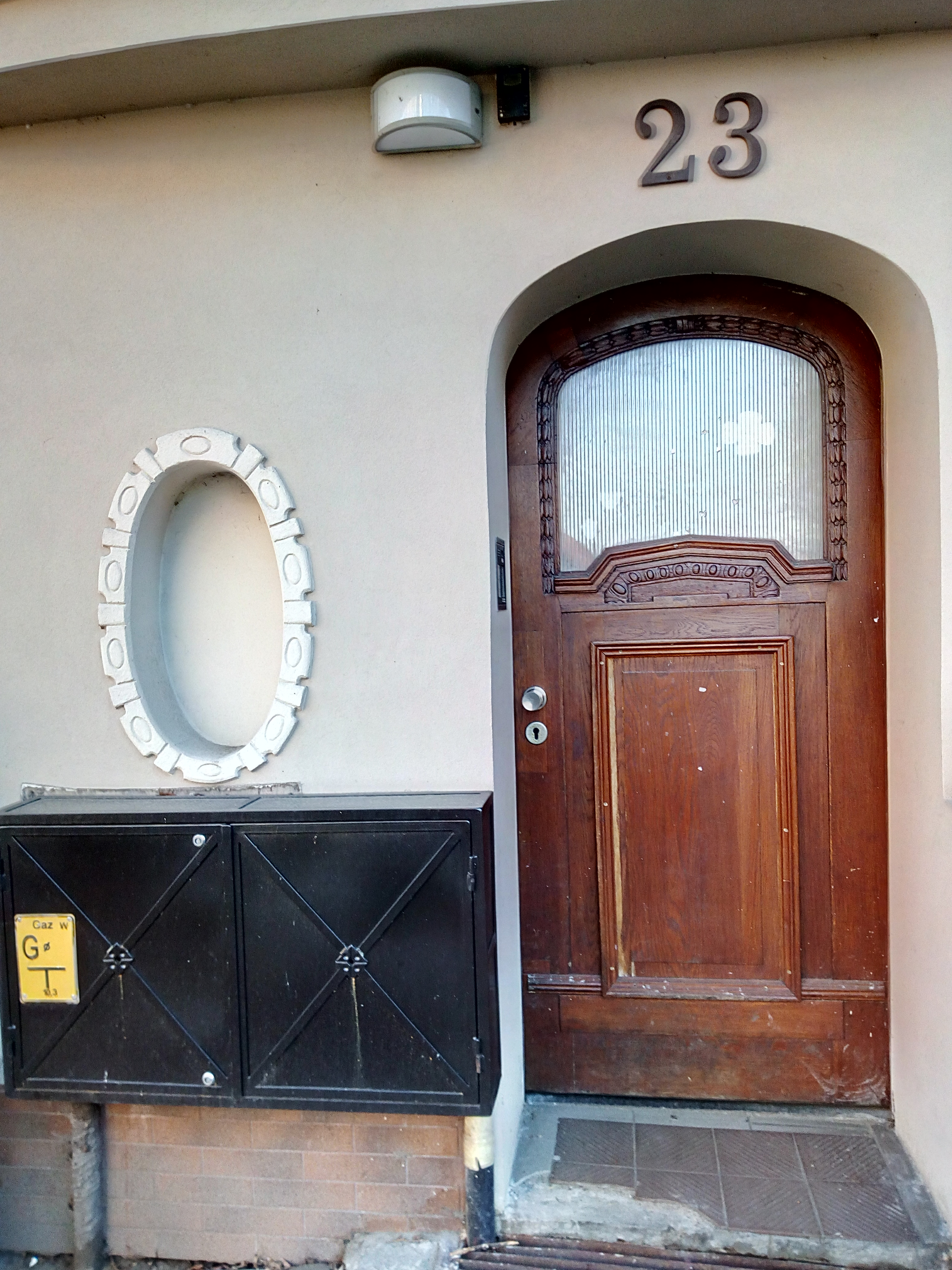
Main door

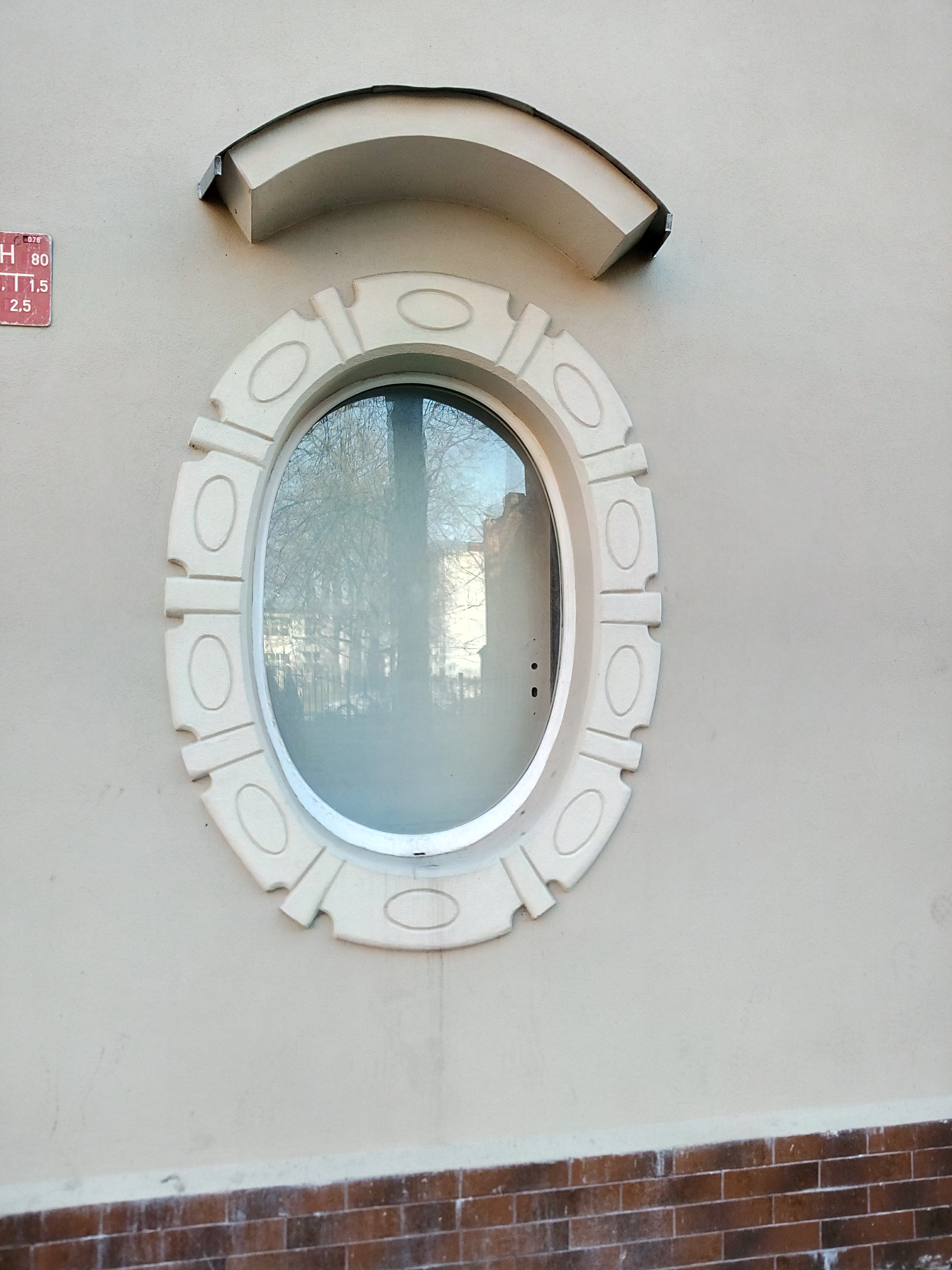
œil-de-bœuf

=== Mauß tenement at 24 ===
1870s

Eclecticism

In the late 1870s, the plot initially welcomed a barn. Oscar and Heinrich Mauß commissioned this tenement in the early 1880s, located then at 15 Cichorien straße for renting purposes. In 1937, Bydgoszcz architect Jan Kossowski moved his studio to this address, where he also lived with his family.

The tenement has been nicely restored in 2018.

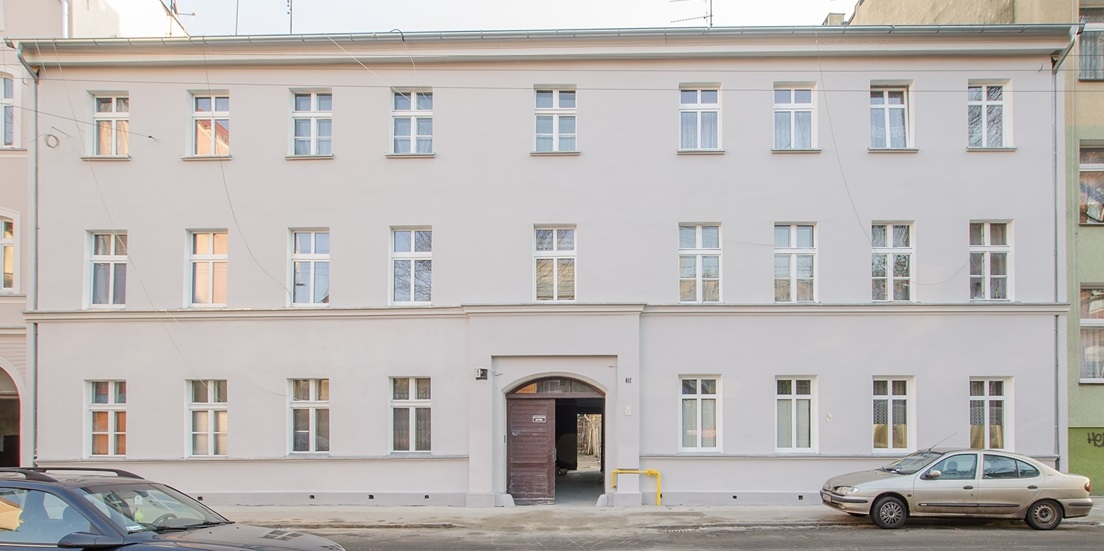
Main frontage

=== Neubauer tenement at 25 ===
1890s

Eclecticism & forms of Neo-Baroque

First landlord was August Neubauer, a rentier. His son Reinhold, a barbier, lived there at the beginning of the 20th century and his wife Mathilde survived him till the outbreak of WWI.

The eclectic frontage is balanced on each side by a Neo-Baroque ensemble comprising windows flanked by a set of columns adorned at their footing with women figures. First floor openings are topped by pediments displaying feminine faces: stuccoed festoons with flowers embellish window sills. The edifice has been entirely renovated in 2021–2022.

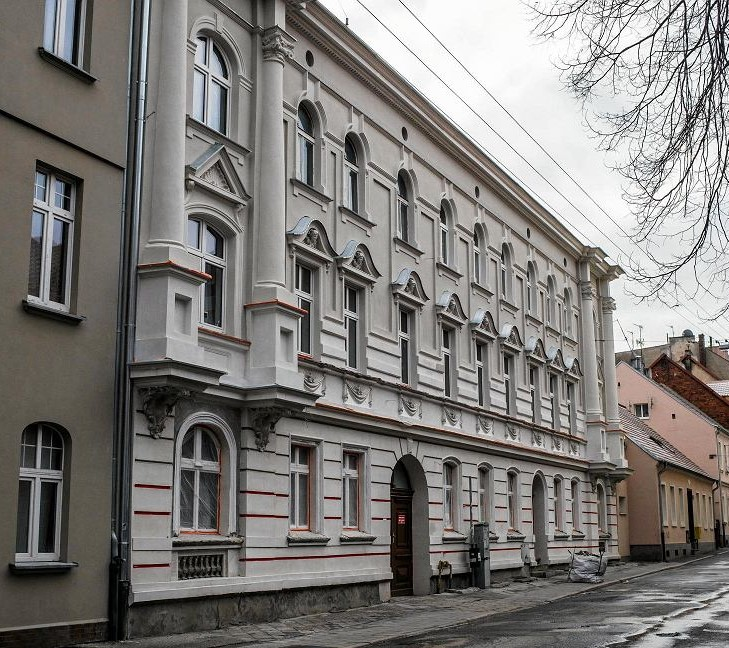
Renovated frontage

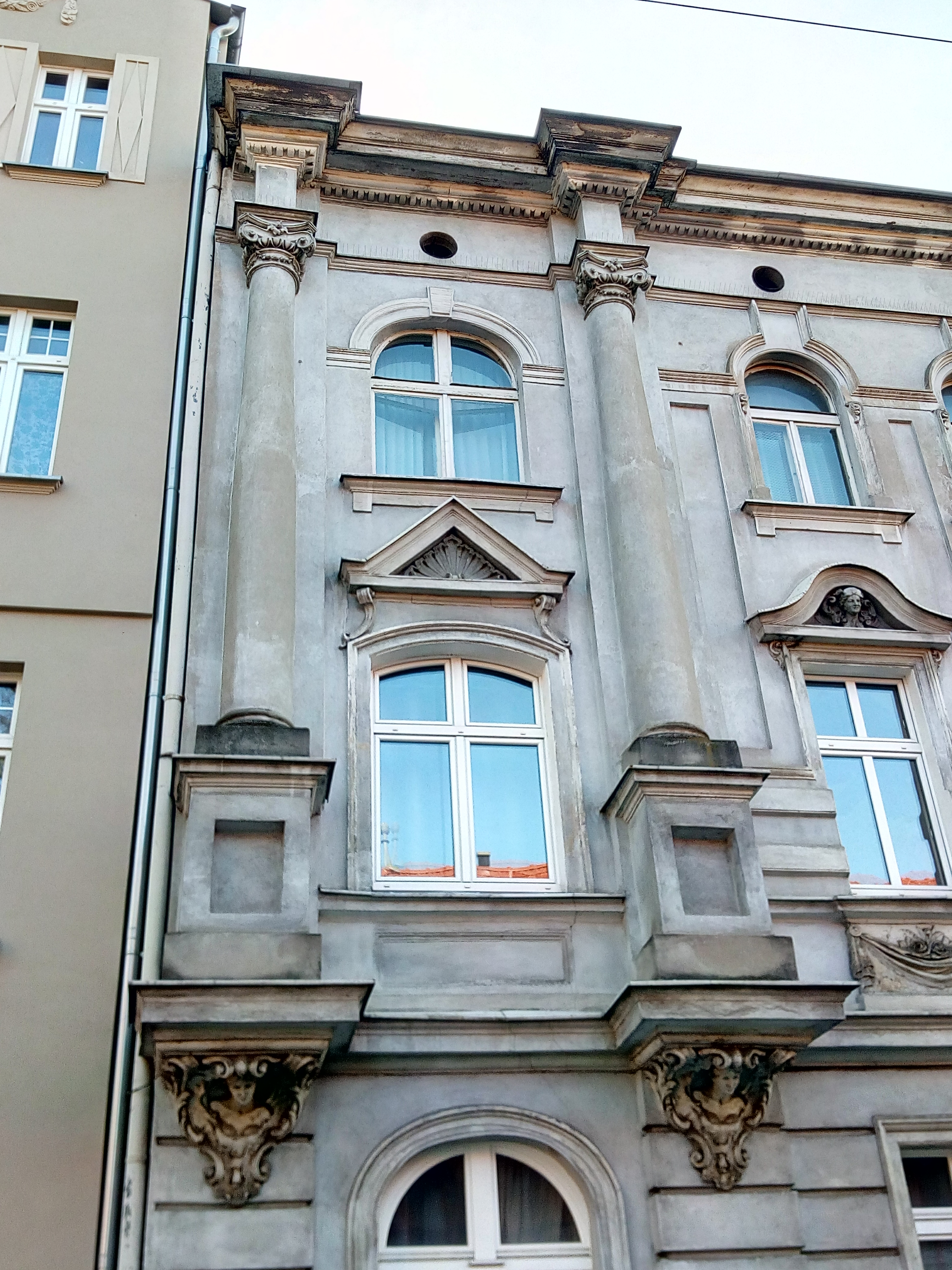
Neo-baroque decoration before refurbishment

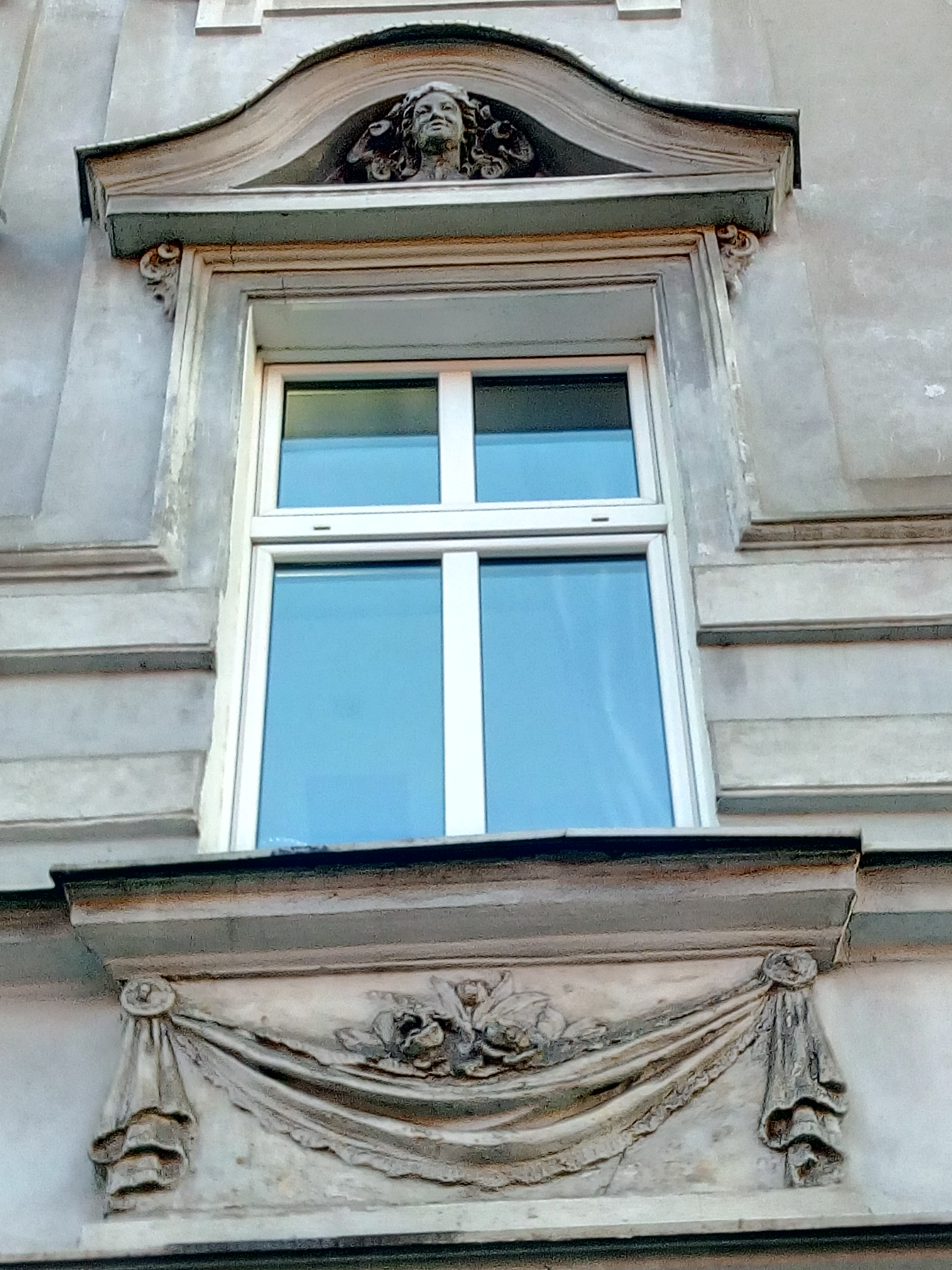
Adorned window before refurbishment

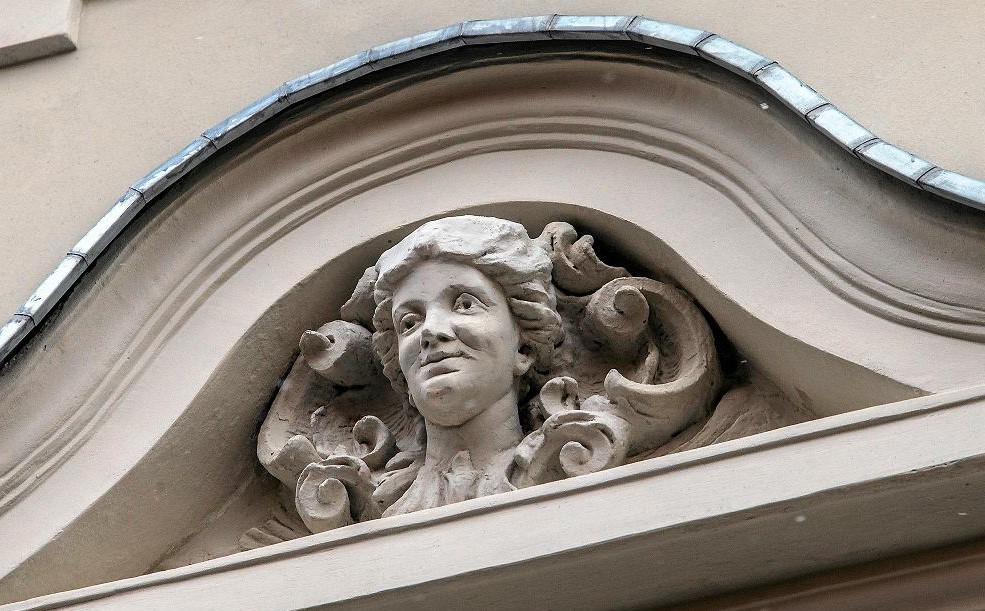
Detail of a figure

=== Crescioli tenement at 26 ===
1870s

Eclecticism

This old building of Kordeckiego street have been owned from its erection to WWI by the Crescioli family: first landlord was Anacleto followed by his widow Bertha. Their relative, Livia, moved to 18 Swiętej Trojcy street after the 1st World War.

The 2016 restoration underlined the frieze of the first floor as well as the window pediments of the second level, topped by a corbel table and delicate motifs.

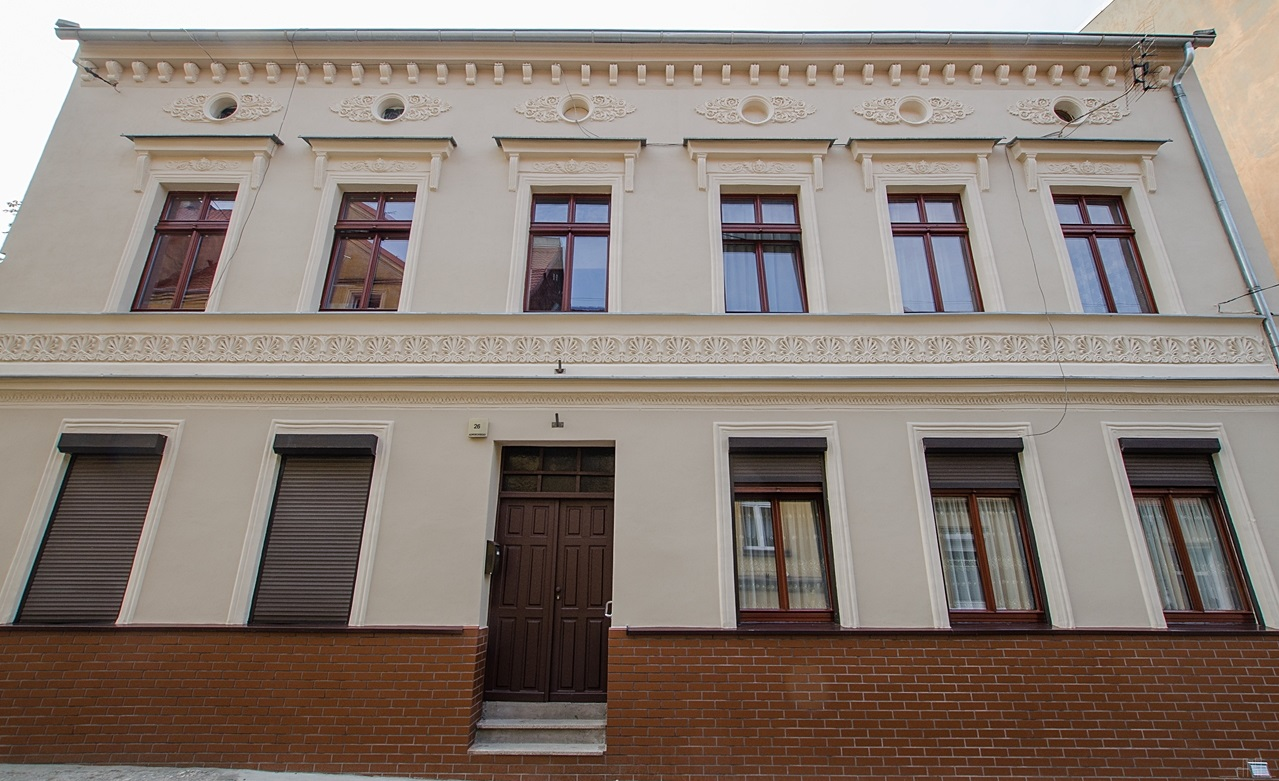
Main elevation

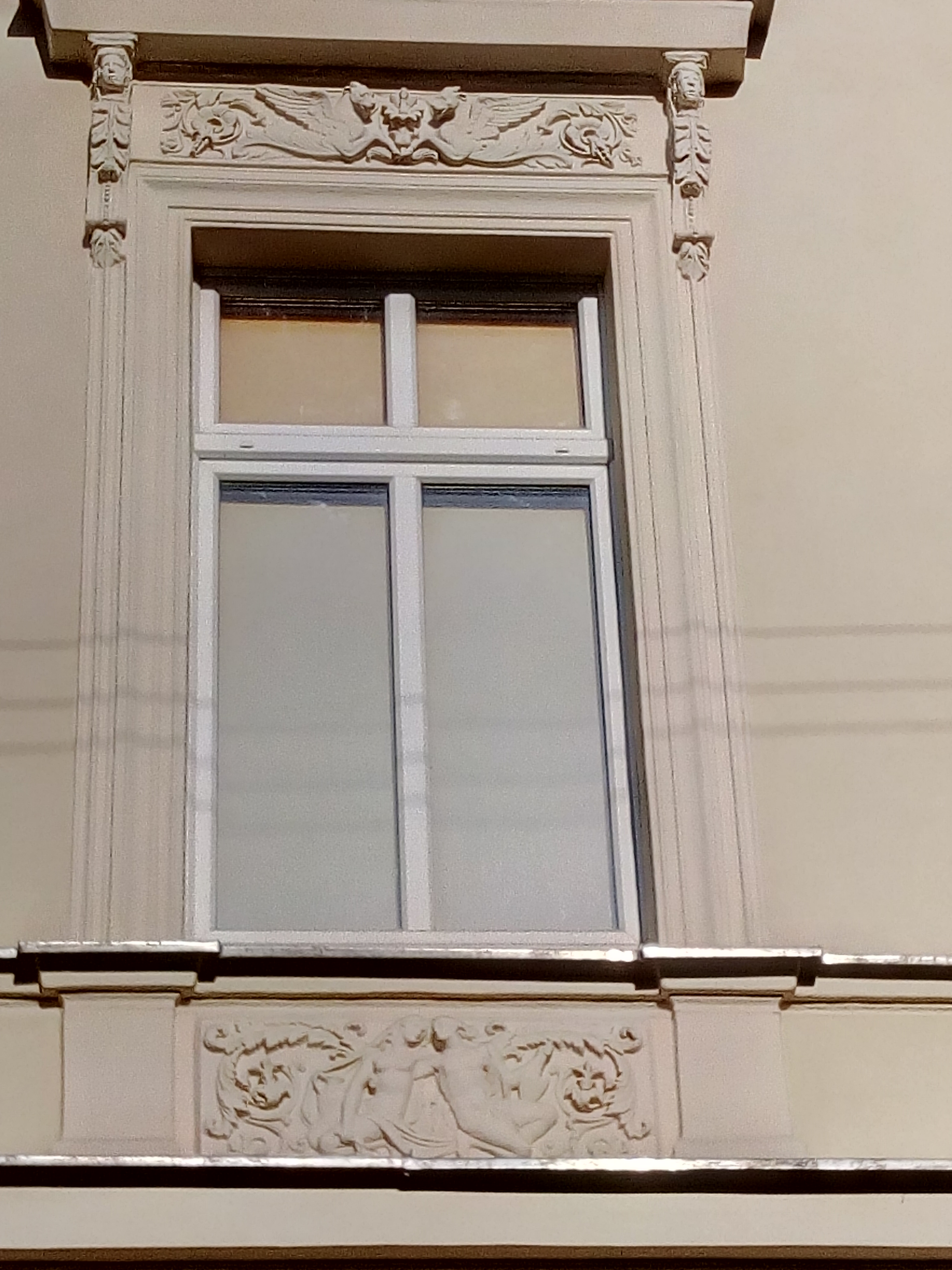
Window decoration

=== Tenement at 30 ===
1890s

Eclecticism

The first landlord of this building, located at the time at Cichorein straße 12b, was Albert Trudnowski, a butcher living in the periphery of Bromberg. The Trudnowski family kept ownership till the end of the 1920s.

The balanced facade reflects an eclectic harmony of the architectural details.

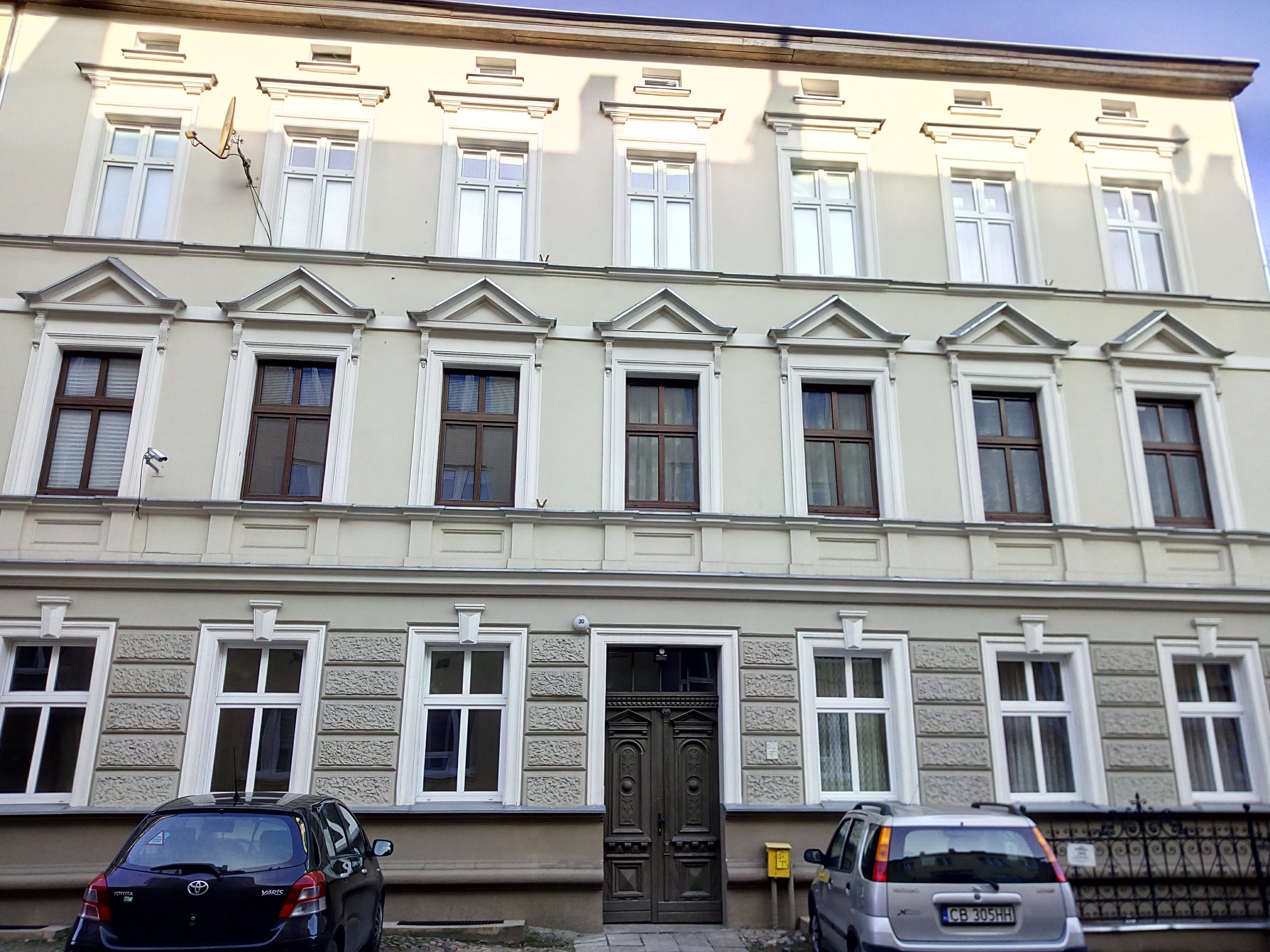
Elevation from the street

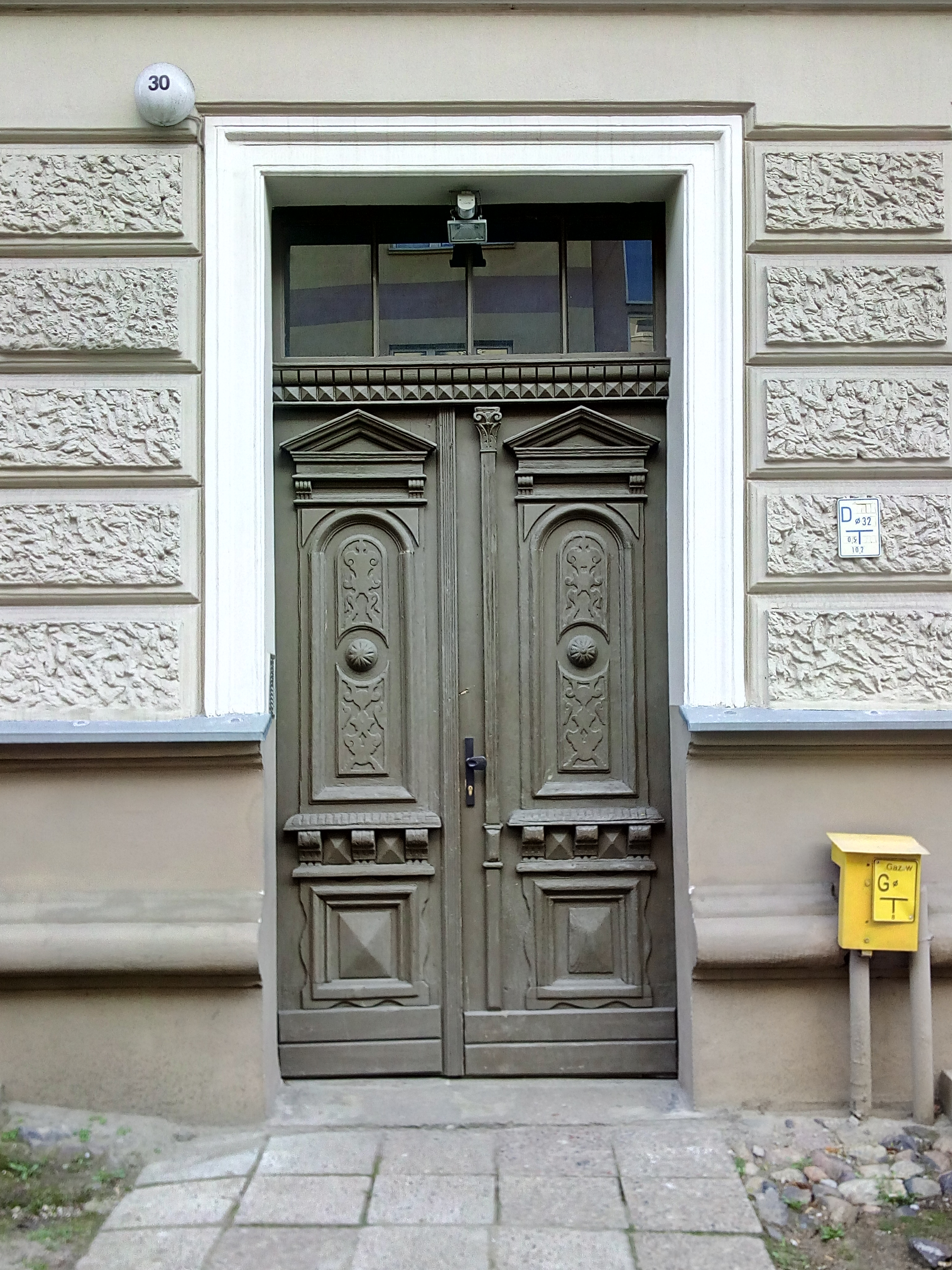
Main door

=== Tenement at 31 ===
1875-1900

Eclecticism

One of the oldest buildings in the street, its first owner was Johann Brauer, a shoemaker; his wife was a midwife. In the 1910s, the edifice was bought by Herbert Spadk, a merchand, for renting purposes.

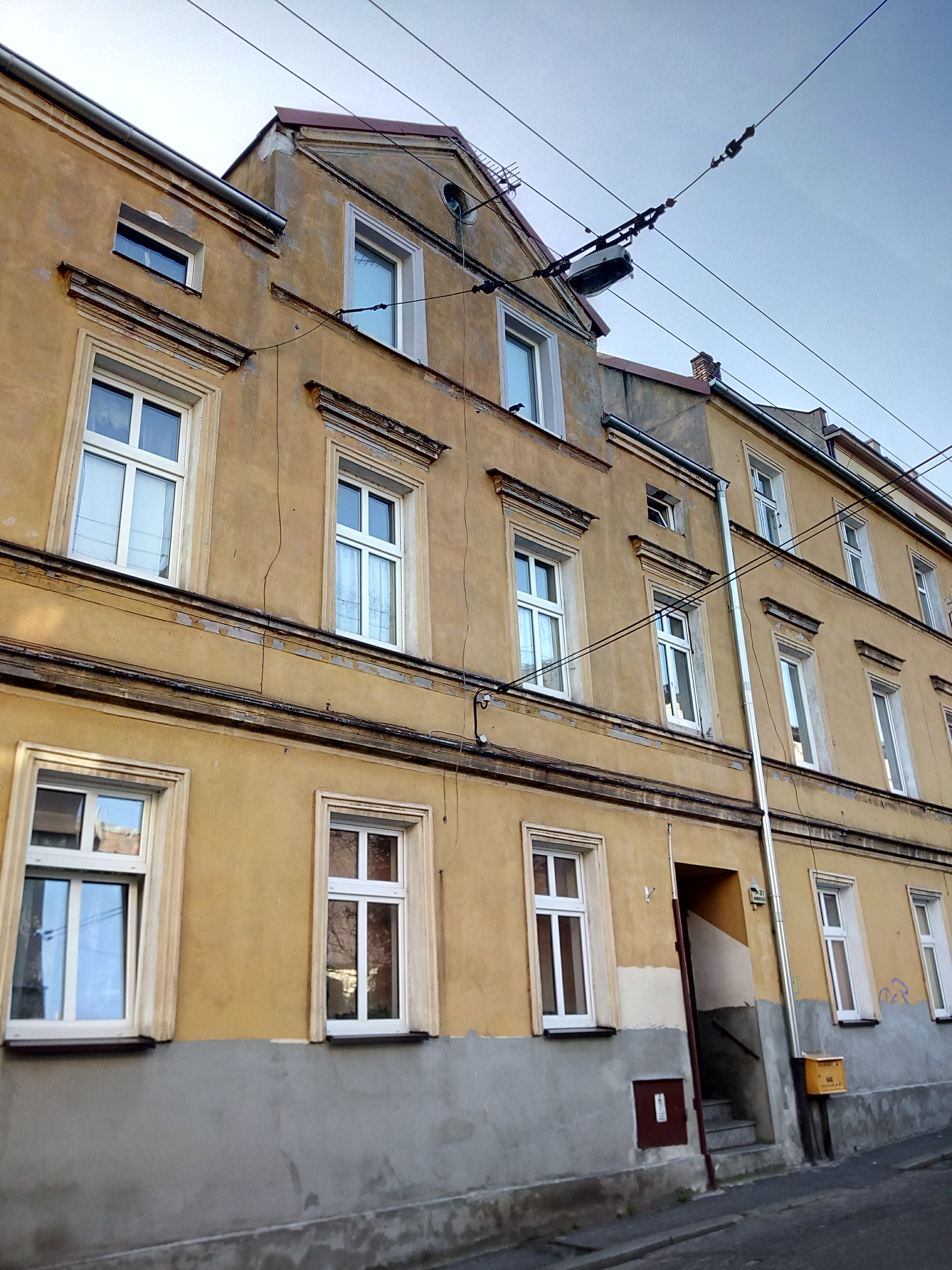
Main facade

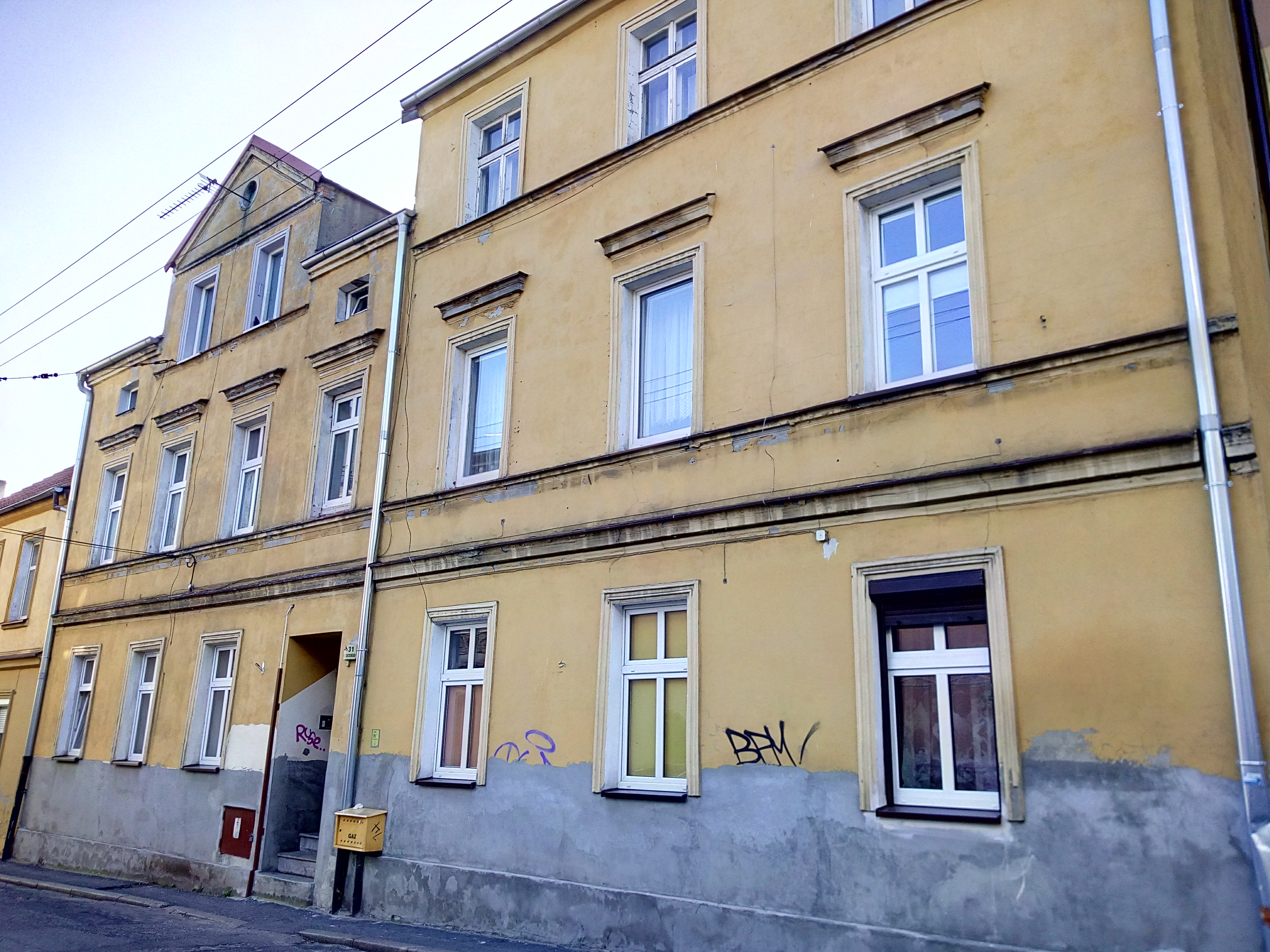
View from the street

=== Tenement at 32 ===
1890s

Eclecticism

Similarly to the house at Nr.30, Albert Trudnowski was the first landlord of this building, located at the time at Cichorein straße 12a. The Trudnowski family kept ownership till the end of the 1920s.

The elevation style mirrors the abutting facade at Nr.30 in the use of architectural motifs.

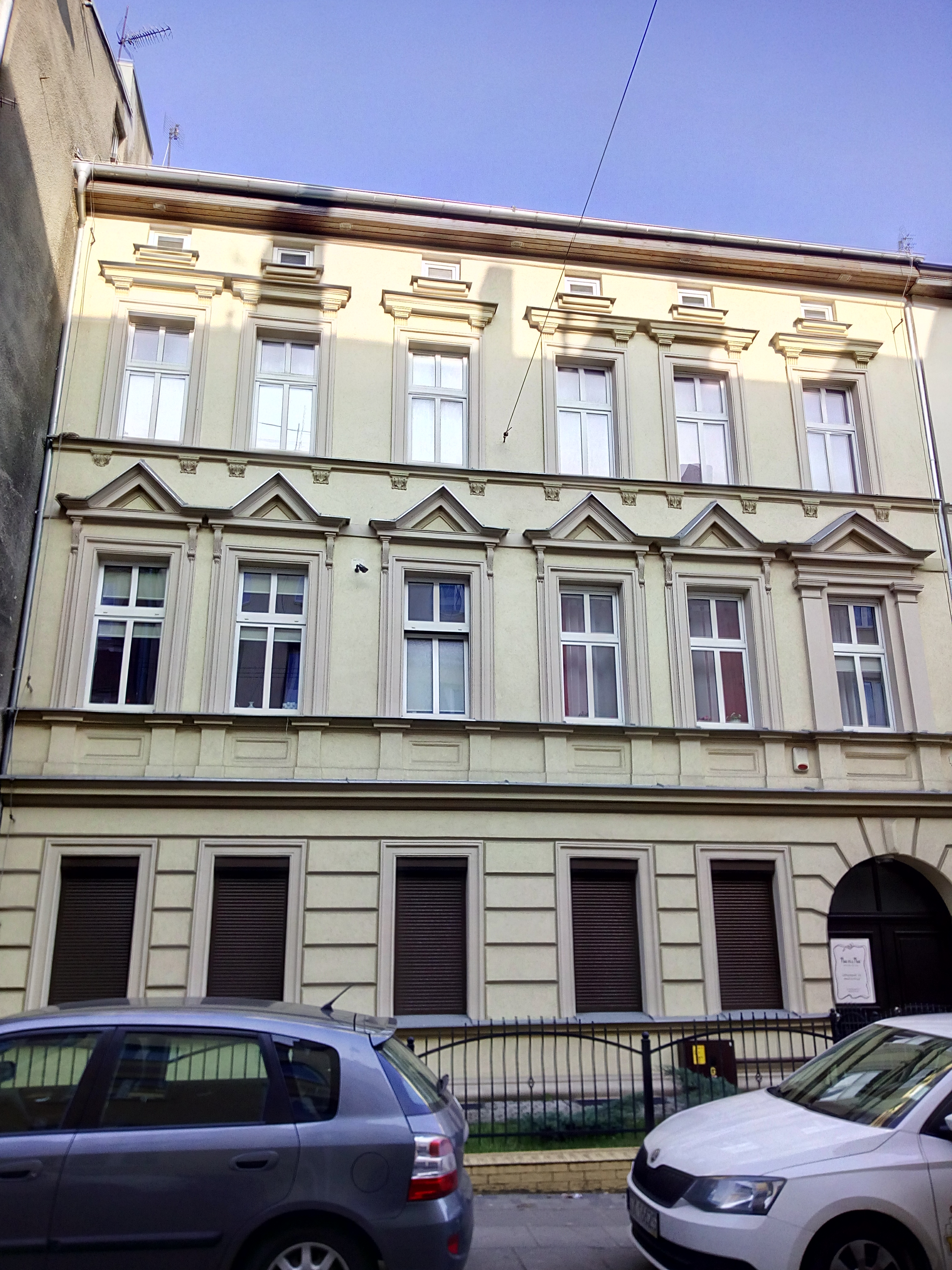
Main frontage

=== Tenement at 1 Plac Poznański, corner with Kordeckiego ===
1912

Early modernism

The plot was a garden when the street has been laid in the 1870s. The landlord at the time of the erection of the current building was Eduard Gawe, a metal craftsman.

The edifice did not suffer major changes since its inception. Once can notice the set a piled balconies on both facades, the canter oriel window at the tenement corner and the series of mansard dormers topped by minute metal tented roof.

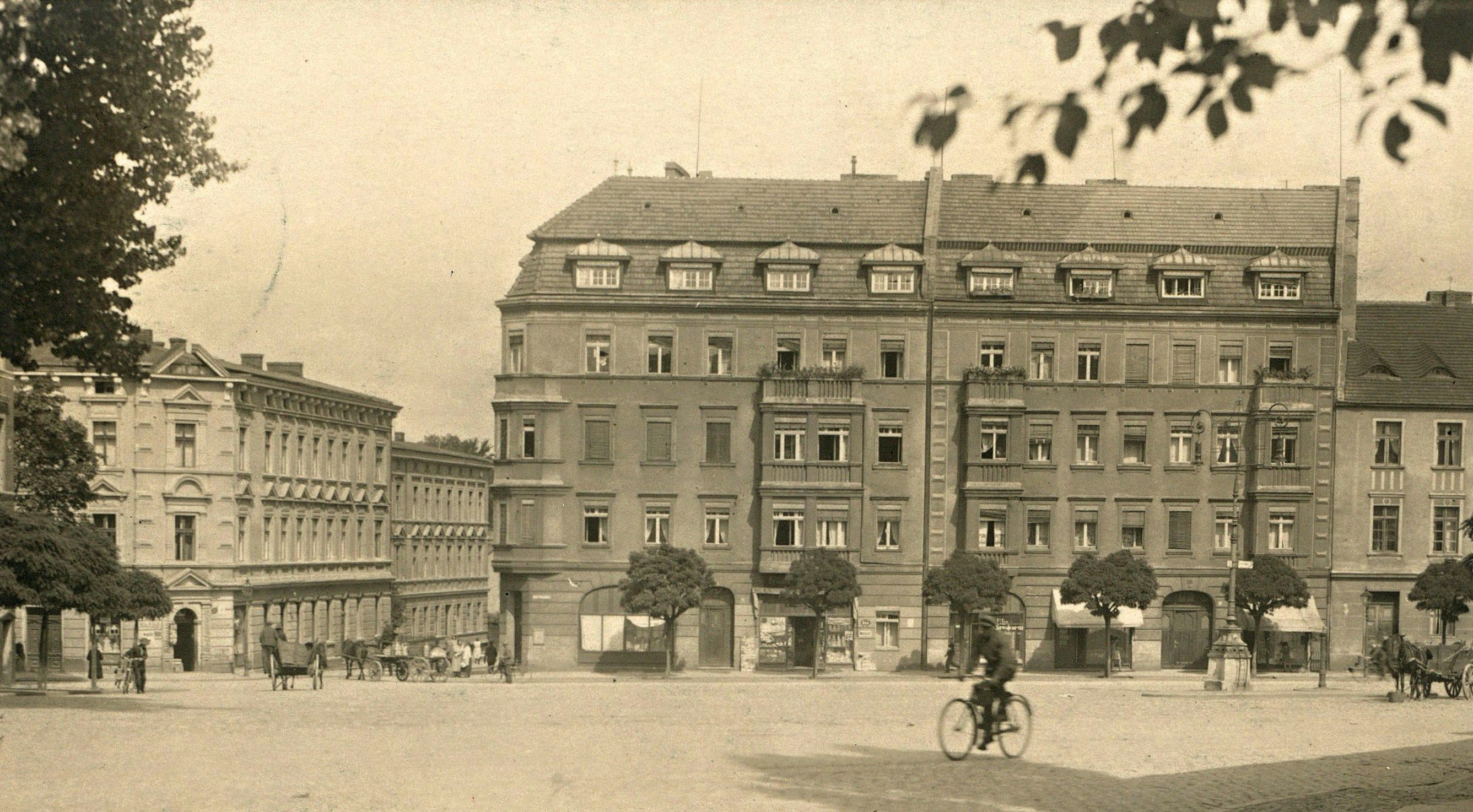
The tenement ca 1932

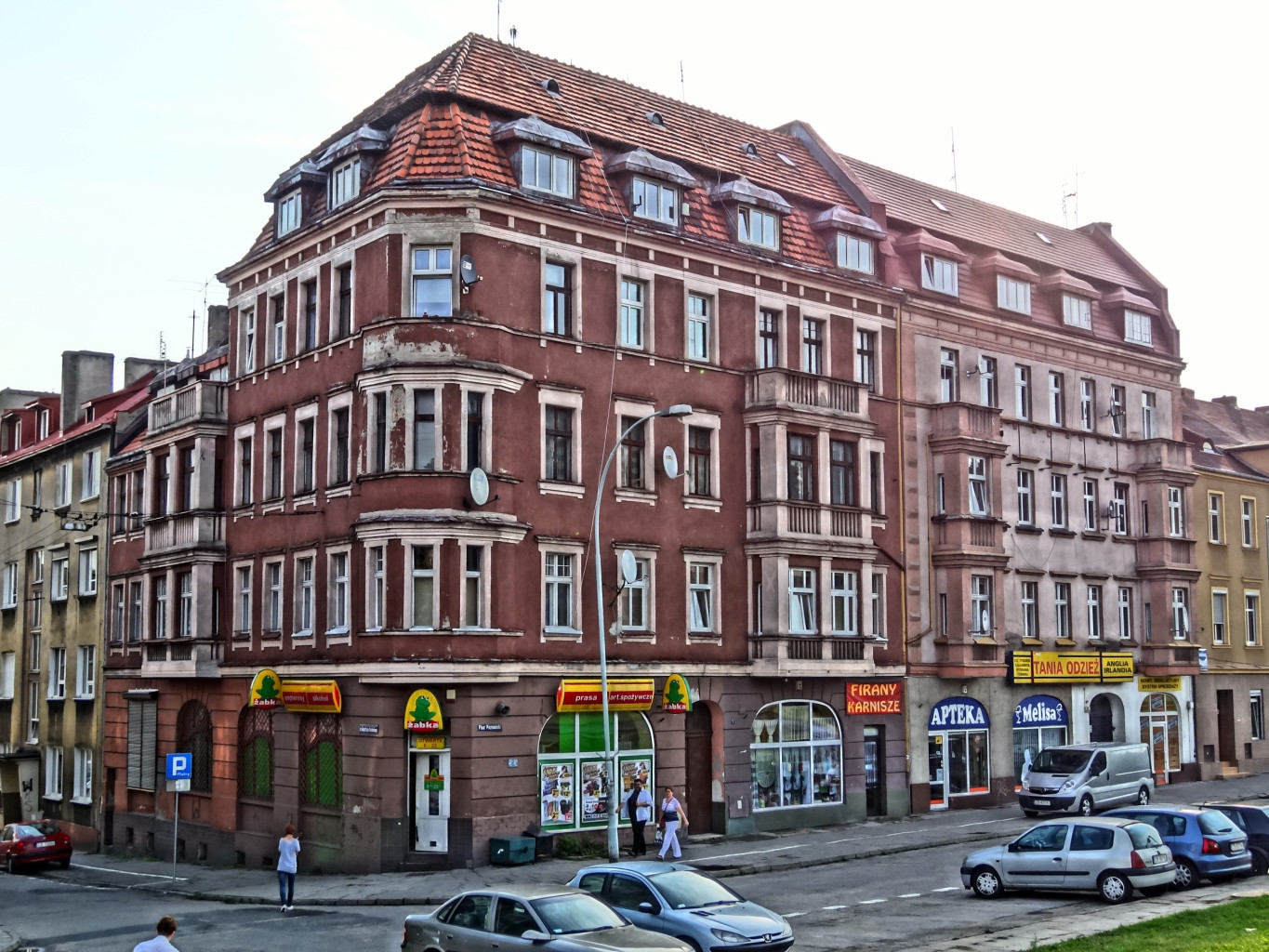
View from the square

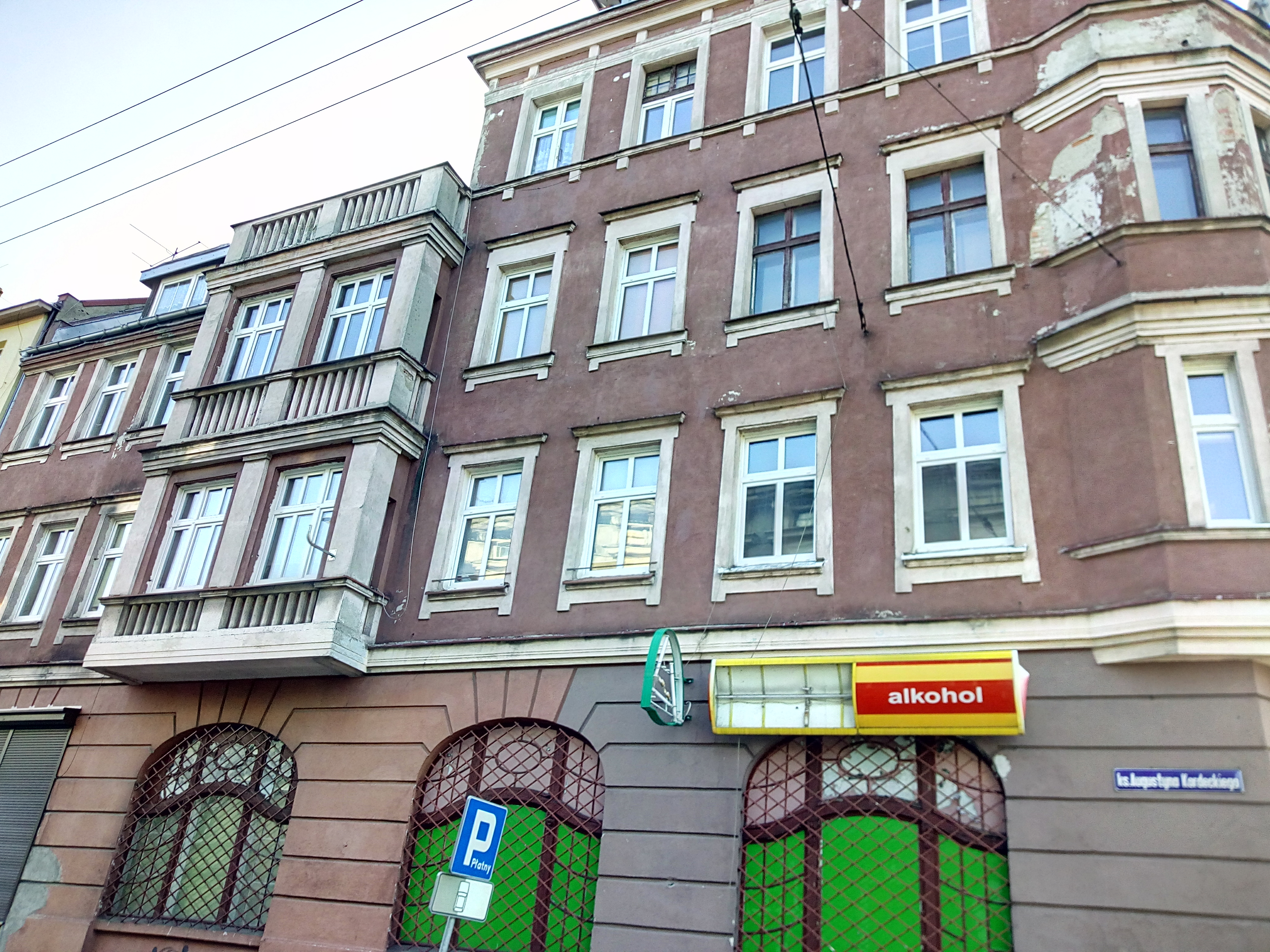
Facade on Kordeckiego

=== Tenement at 2 Plac Poznański, corner with Kordeckiego ===
1912

Late Eclecticism

Like for buildings at Nr.30 and 32, Albert Trudnowski was the first landlord of this house, located at the time at Cichorein straße 11. The tenement belonged to the Trudnowski family till the end of the 1920s.

Both balanced elevations display typical eclectic architectural details: pediments or cartouche-like lintel on windows and a table corbel above a dentil running all the way on the top.

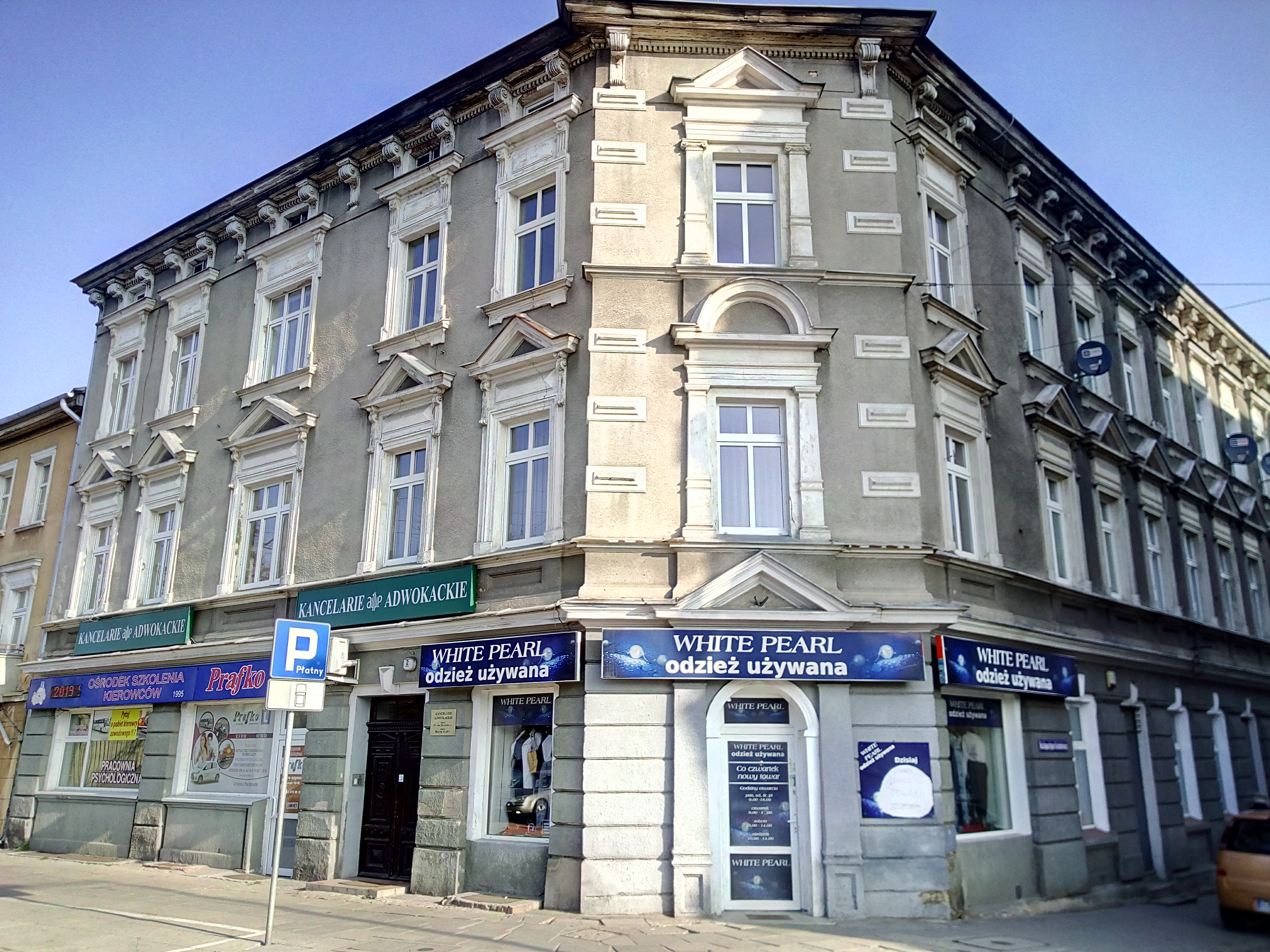
View from the street

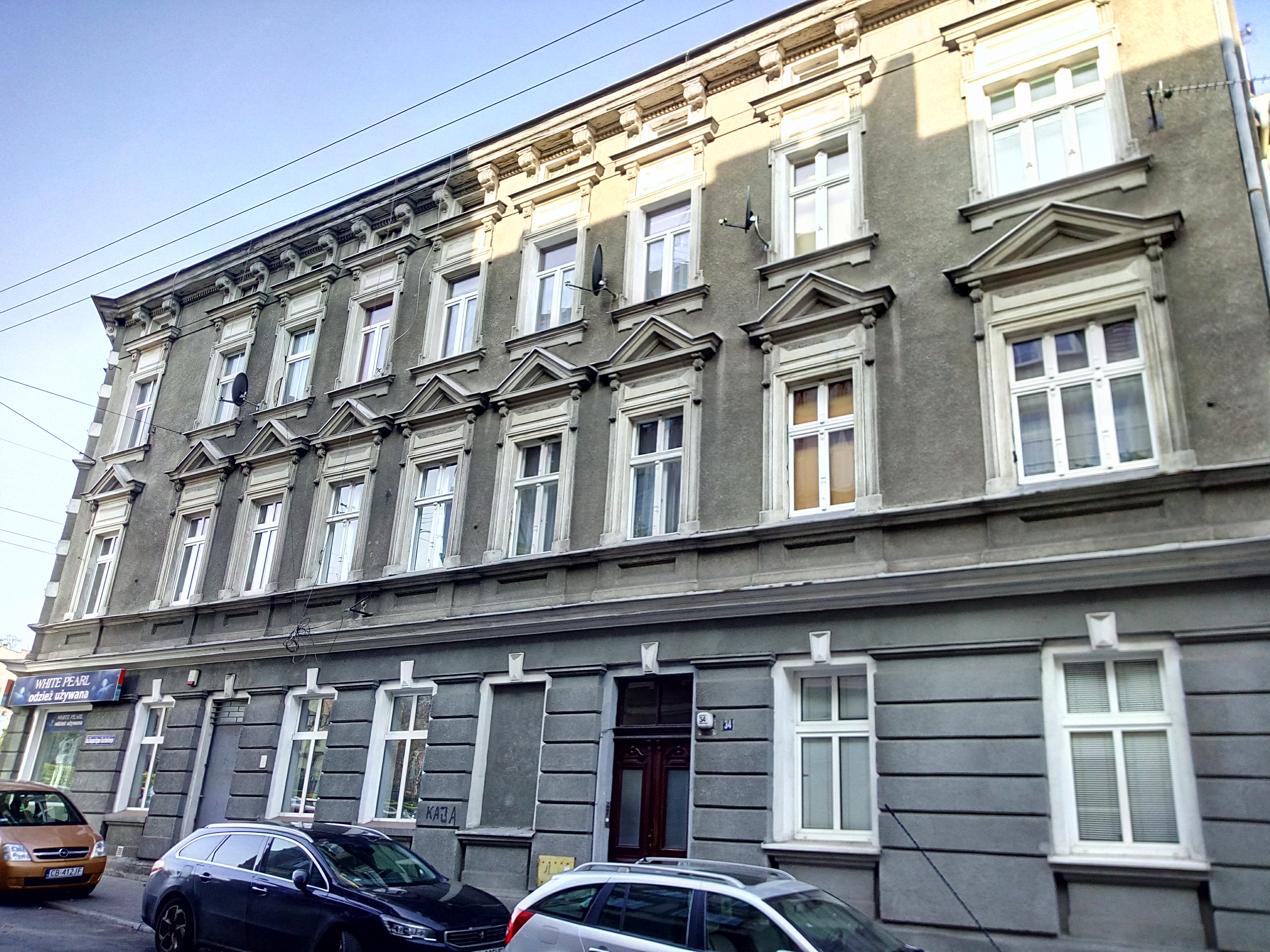
Facade on Kordeckiego

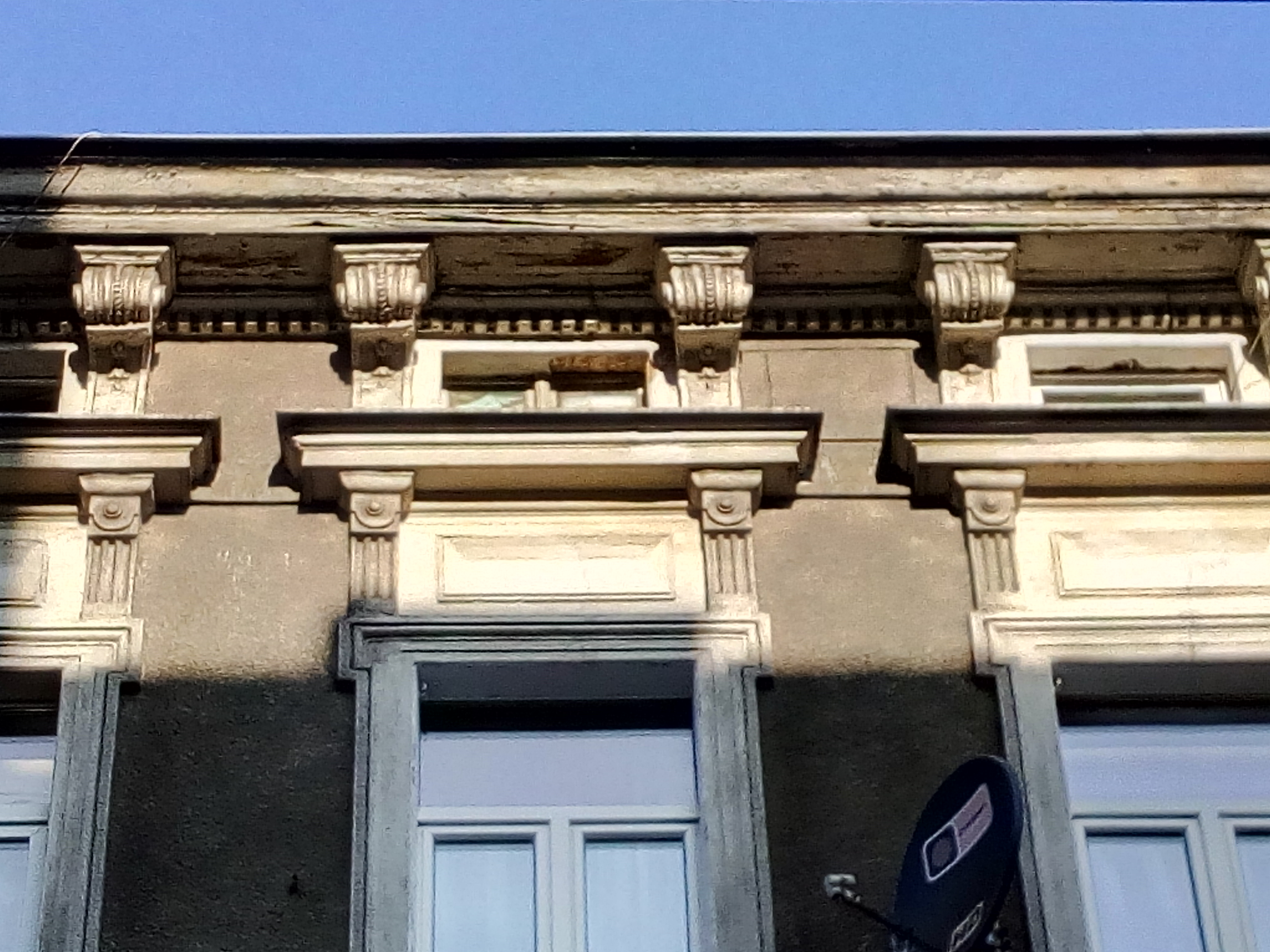
Detail of the corbel

== See also ==
- Bydgoszcz
- Swiętej Trojcy street
- Focha Street
- Królowej Jadwigi Street

== Bibliography ==
- Mackiewicz, Zygmunt (2004). Historia szkolnictwa wyższego w Bydgoszczy (in Polish). Bydgoszcz: Bydgoskie Towarzystwo Naukowe. pp. 35–46. ISBN 83-917322-7-4.
