= Marshal Ferdinand Foch Street, Bydgoszcz =

Street in Bydgoszcz, Poland

Coordinates: 53.1257°N 17.9945°E

Marshal Ferdinand Foch Street
Bydgoszcz
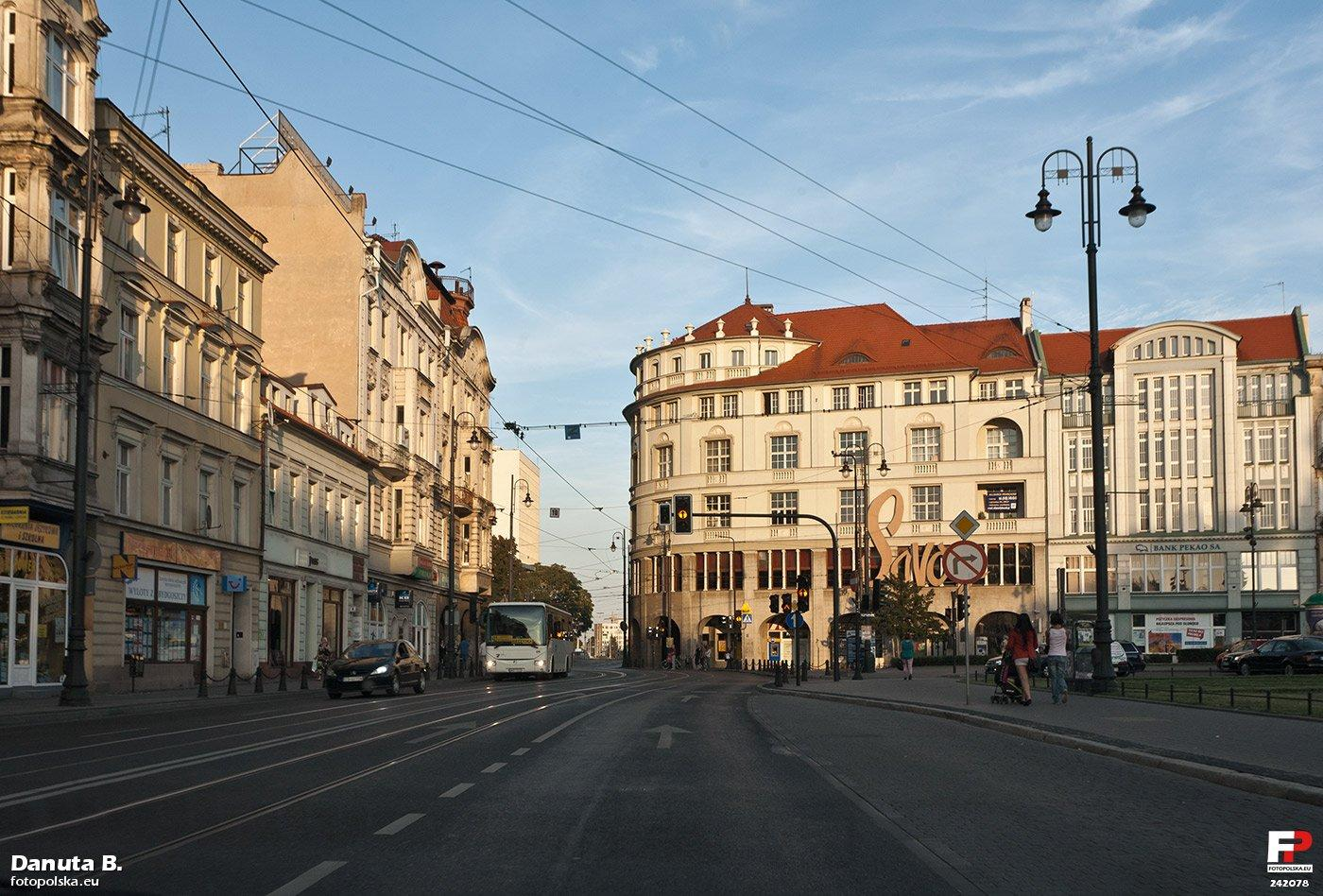
- View in the vicinity of Theatre square

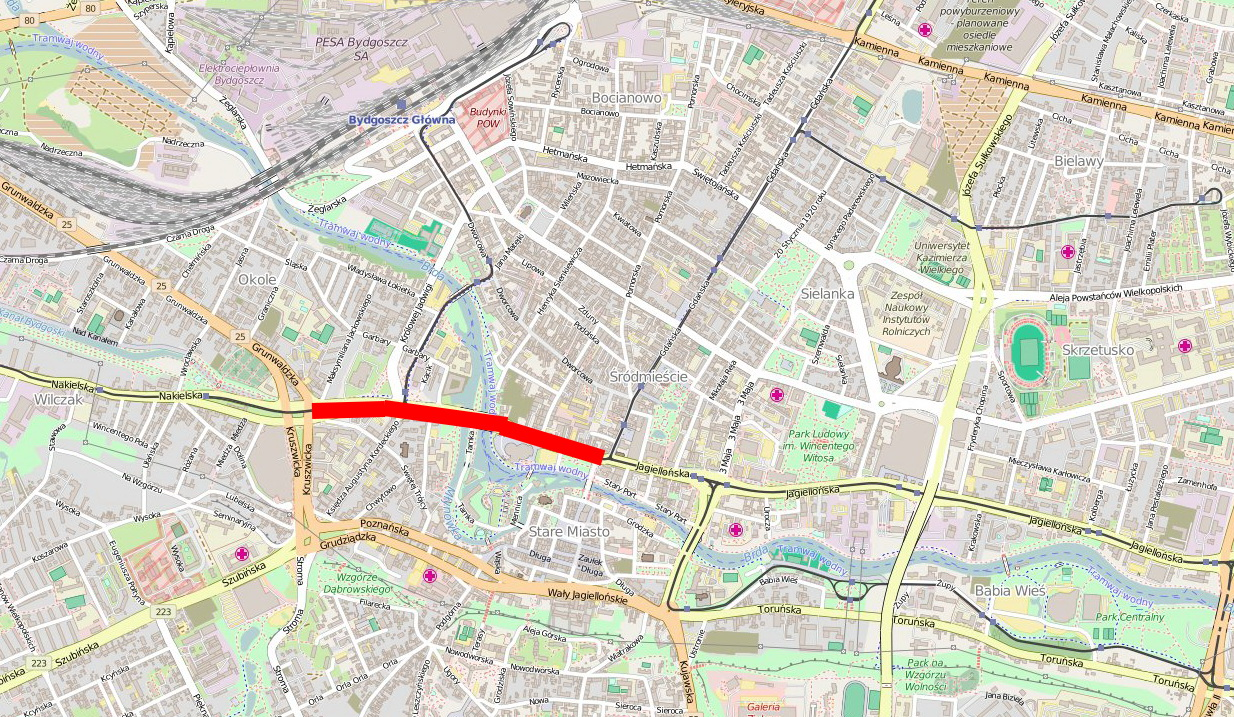
- Focha street in downtown Bydgoszcz
- Native name: Ulica Marszałka Ferdynanda Focha w Bydgoszczy (Polish)
- Former name: Wilhelmstraße - Jagiellońska - Hermann-Göringstraße - Robotniczo-Chłopska Armia Czerwona
- Namesake: French born Marshal Ferdinand Foch
- Owner: City of Bydgoszcz
- Length: 1.1 km (0.68 mi)
- Area: Downtown Bydgoszcz
- Location: Bydgoszcz, Poland

Marshal Ferdinand Foch Street or Focha Street is a main street of Bydgoszcz, in Downtown district (Polish: Śródmieście).

== Location ==
Located in the center of Bydgoszcz, the street stretches east–west from the intersection with Gdańska Street to Grunwaldska roundabout. It is approximately 1.1 kilometres (0.68 mi) long. To the west, it joins with Nakielska street, and with Jagiellońska street to the east.

== Appellation ==
The street bore the following names throughout history:

- 1840 - 1920, Wilhelmstraße;
- 1920 - 1931, Jagiellońska street;
- 1932 - 1939, Marshal Ferdinand Foch - Marshal of France and Poland, commander in chief of Allied Forces in 1918. He signed in Compiègne the truce ending hostilities with the German Empire;
- 1939 - 1945 - Hermann Göringstraße;
- 1945 - 1949 - Marshal Foch;
- 1950 - 1990 - Red Army;
- 1990 - Kazimierz III Wielki;
- From 1990 - Marshal Foch.

== History ==
Focha street has been one of the key routes in Bydgoszcz, since the first half of the 19th century. Previously, the path was a dirt road leading from the Old Carmelite Monastery to meadows bordering the Brda river, which were owned by the monastery. This course is clearly visible on the oldest plan of Bydgoszcz, realized by the Swedish quartermaster Erik Dahlbergh in 1657. Without any bridge to the west to cross the river, the street ended along the waterfront, with a diverging path leading to Koronowo and Nakło nad Notecią - today Dworcowa Street in Bydgoszcz- until 1850.

In 1774, the construction of the Bydgoszcz Canal required the building of a city lock and a causeway leading to Mill Island, which allowed the crossing of the Brda River in the continuity to the west of the axis. The road then gained in traffic, as being also used for towing boats along the Bydgoszcz Canal.

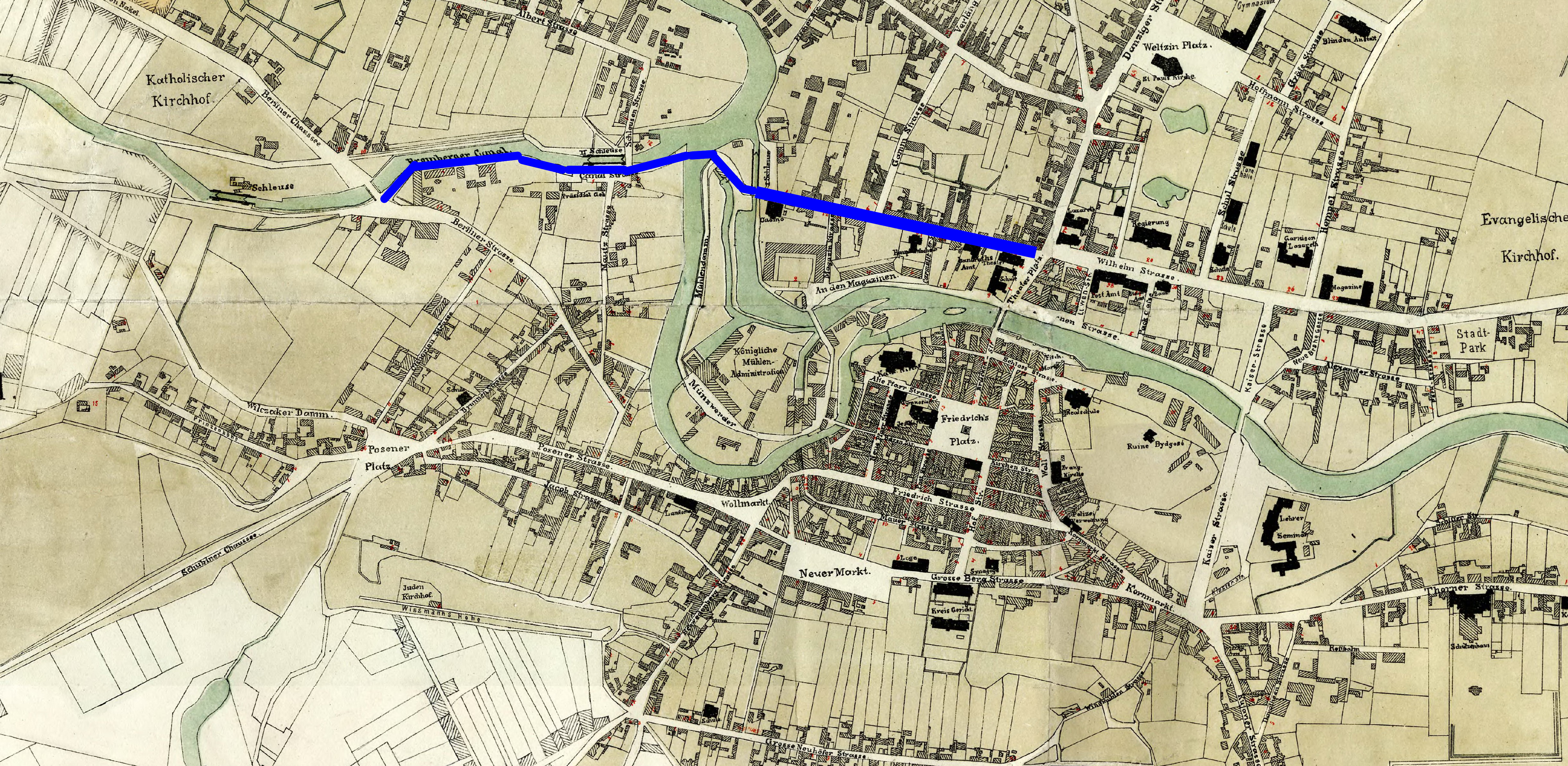
Focha street on an 1876 map

In the second half of the 19th century, the eastern tip of the street connected with the new administrative center of the city, with the erection in 1836 of the Governmental seat of the Prussian region on Jagiellońska street. In Focha street were built in the 1860s tenements for local garrison personnel. Real estate cadastral files of Bromberg from 1878 reveals that a southern frontage of houses stood in the area from Theatre square to the Opera Nova. On the northern bank of the Brda river stood a military casino (from 1869) on the corner of the street. The villa of the president of the Prussian region was located at the level of today's Nr.25, together with garrison lodgings: in the same area was standing lock Nr.2 - Polish: Śluza II „Grottgera”- on the old Bydgoszcz Canal (now the plot at the intersection with Grottger Street). The area in the bend of the Brda was occupied by military buildings, including the city's largest granaries, the Royal Granaries. To the west of lock Nr.2, the axis was called Channel street (German: Canal Strasse), and winded along the Bydgoszcz Canal. At the level of today's Higher School of Economics was standing a bridge crossing the canal over lock Nr.2.

From 1885 to 1890, new bridges have been built:

- Wilhelmsbrücke, renamed after 1920 Jagiellonska Bridge over the Brda river;
- Hafenbrücke, renamed after 1920 Port Bridge.

Both had a steel structure, with a wide roadway, sidewalks and gas lighting. Today, both bridges comprise Solidarnosc Bridge. With this construction, the street assumed a critical character in the city, linking western suburbs (Okole, Wilczak) with downtown. At the time, the street was used as a route march military parade, together with Gdańska Street and Mostowa street. During interwar period, Focha Street did not extend to the west further than the intersection with Swiętej Trojcy street.

During World War II, Solidarnosc Bridge was destroyed: it has been since rebuilt several times (1939, 1945, 1950s). It has now a reinforced concrete structure.

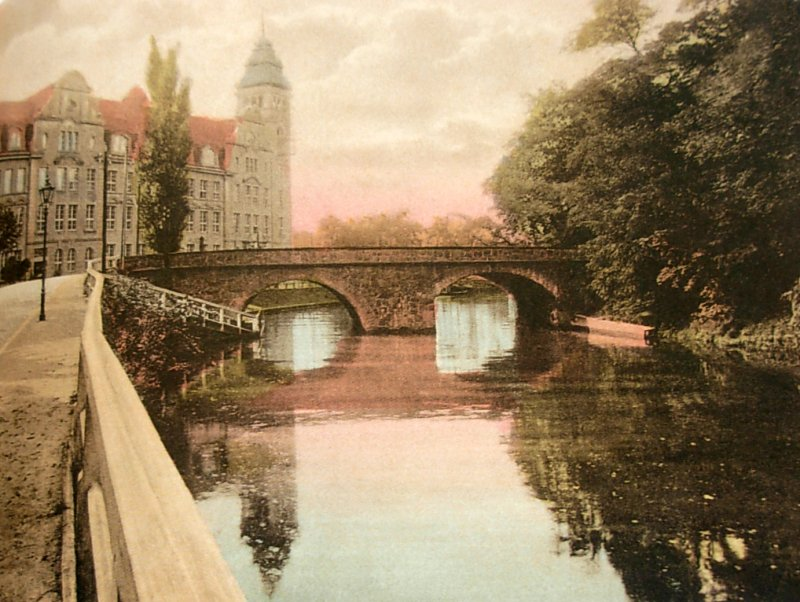
Władysław IV Bridge in 1911

After World War II, the increased traffic required an expansion of Focha street. In the 1970s, an urban traffic renovation modernized Focha street to the west of Brda with a dual carriageway on both side of the tram track. Part of this program led to the controversial filling of approximately one kilometre of the old Bydgoszcz Canal, together with the destruction of two locks (Nr.2 at Świętej Trójcy street and Nr.3 at Grunwaldzka street) and the demolition of Władysław IV bridge. At the beginning of the 1980s, in order to renovate the tramway line, last pieces of Focha street's old granite pavement has been recovered with asphalt. Last renovation of the street occurred in 2010–2012, to integrate the new tram tracks from the train station at the intersection with Kordecki and Queen Jadwiga streets: it encompassed also the street section from Theatre Square to Solidarnosc bridge.

== Means of transportation ==
Tram tracks on Focha street were built in 1905. The line has been extended to the west, from Theatre Square to Nakielska street, becoming the third line electrically powered in the city (line "C" blue, in 1901). In 1904, this line has been extended eastward to Bartodzieje district. In 1957, a second tram track has been built, and in the 1972–1974, while building the Grunwaldzka roundabout, a double-track tram line in the western part of Focha street has been laid to the roundabout. Currently, tram lines Nr.1, 3, 5 and 8 pass through Focha street.

The street is one of the busiest traffic thoroughfares in Bydgoszcz. Traffic measures realized in 2006 showed that during peak periods approximately 2000 vehicles pass every hour.

== Main edifices ==
=== Tenement Max Zweininger Bydgoszcz, at 2, corner house with Gdańska Street ===
1901–1902, by Karl Bergner

Vienna Secession

The house has been built for Max Zweininger, owner of a famous hat manufactory in Bromberg, located on the square.

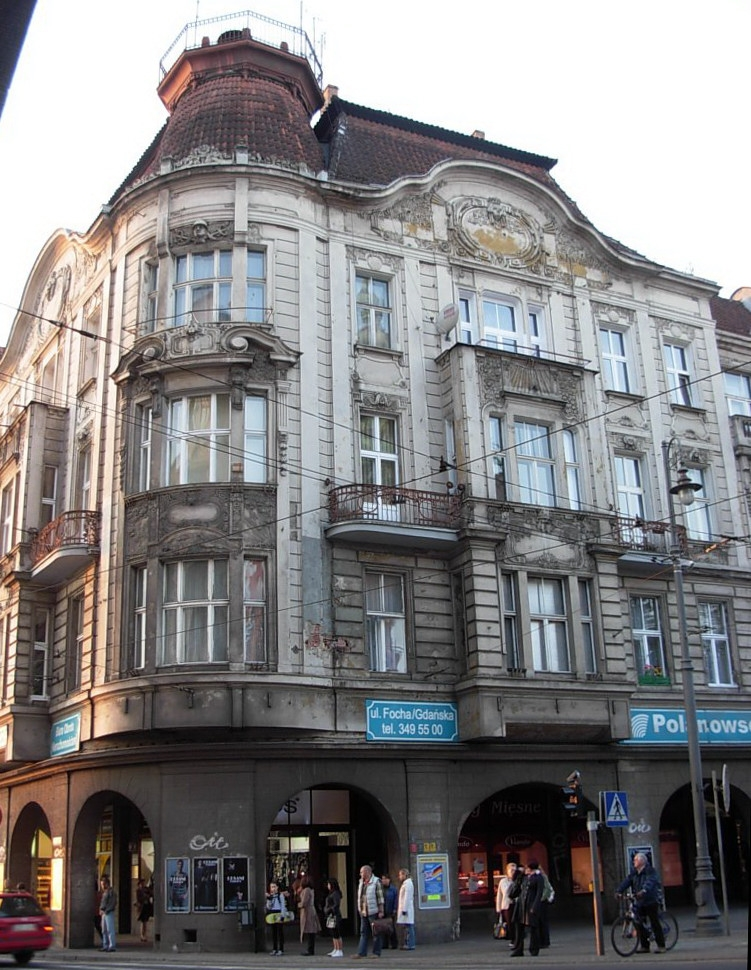
View of the corner

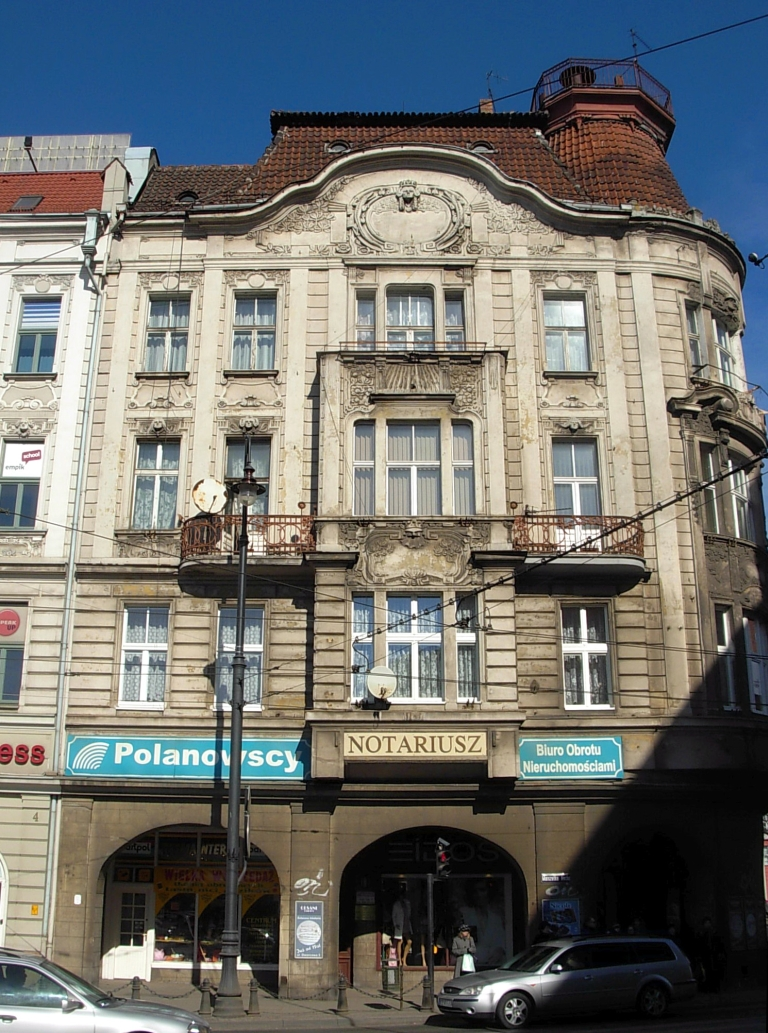
Frontage on Focha Street

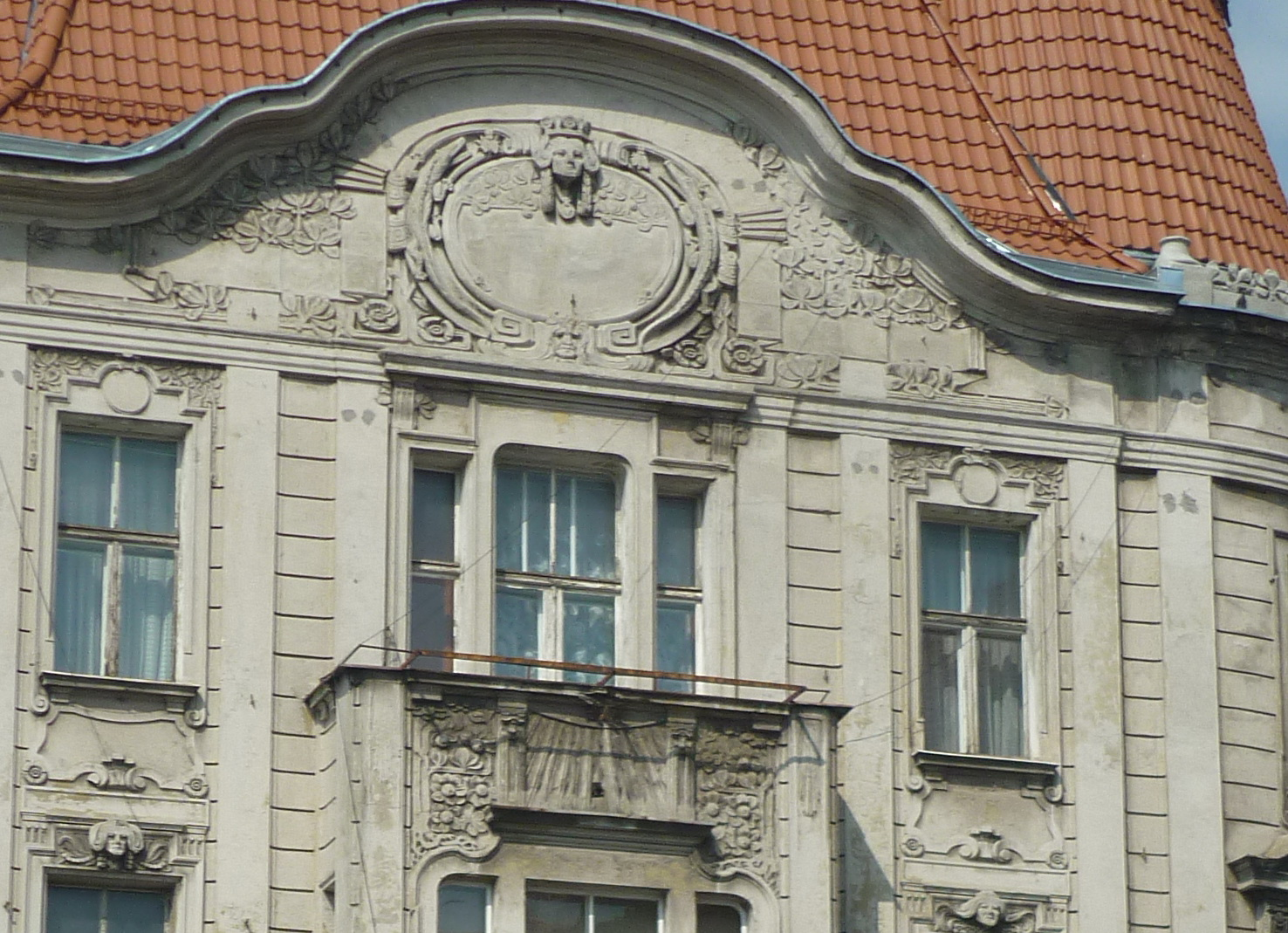
Decoration detail

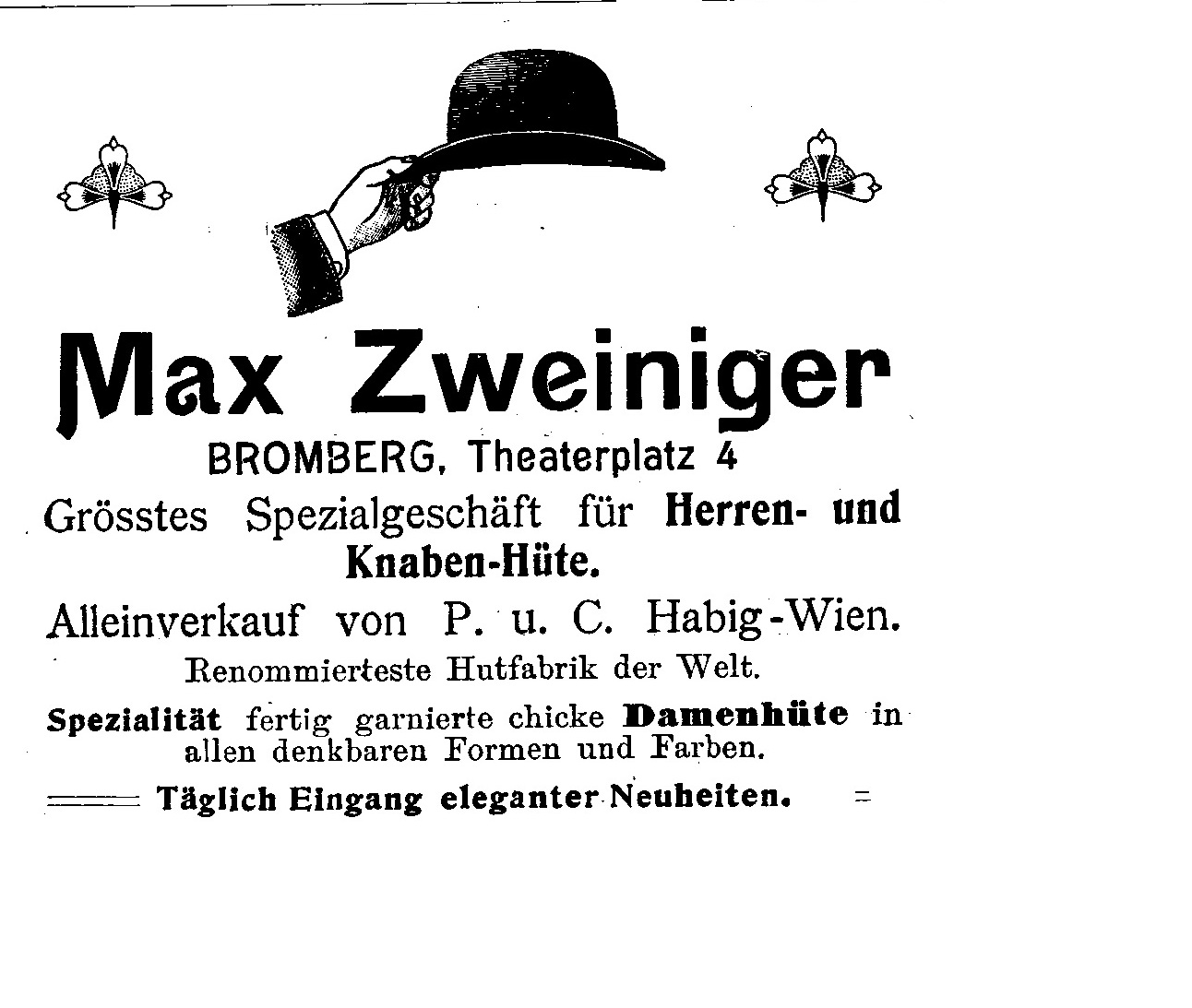
Advertising for Zweiniger's shop in 1905

=== Tenement at 4 ===
Registered on Kuyavian-Pomeranian Voivodeship heritage list, Nr.601292, Reg. A/849, April 22, 1996

1901–1902, by Karl Bergner

Vienna Secession & Eclecticism

The building at then-Wilhelmstraße 17 has been built to be a renting tenement, owned by Mr. Rapiewocki, a merchant.

The elevation echoes the one at Nr.2, by the same architect: identical bay window, flanked by wrought iron balconies. Even the decoration is alike: figures, cartouches, ornaments and scrollworks, up to the facade pediment.

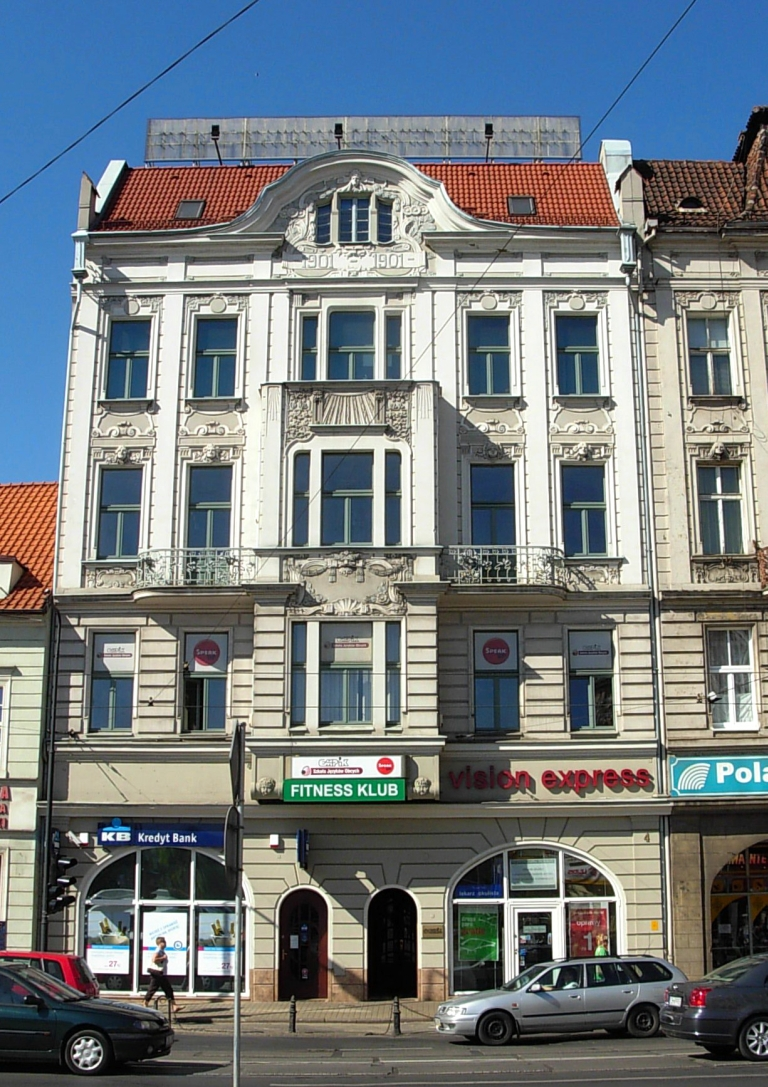
View from Focha street

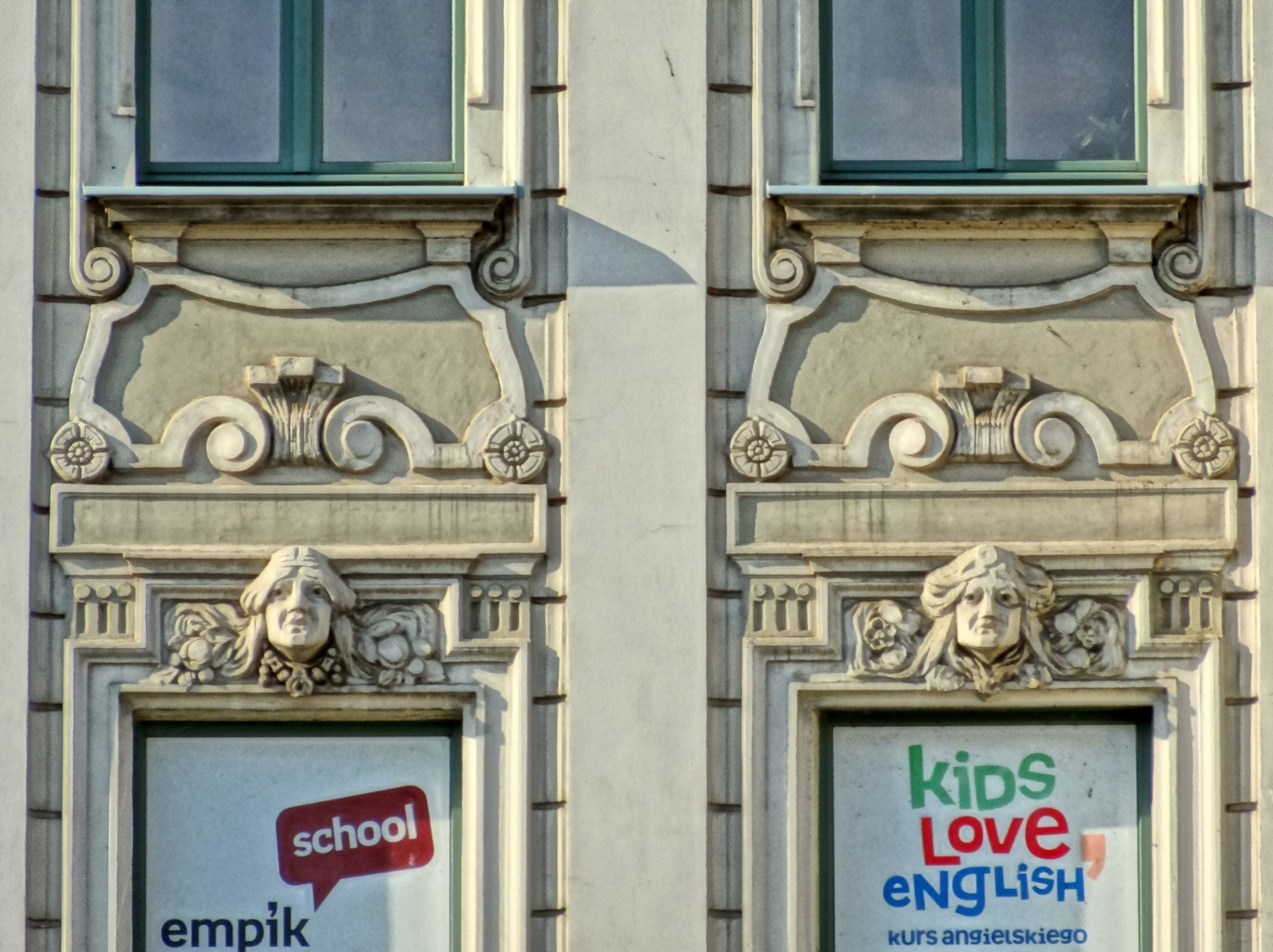
Decoration detail

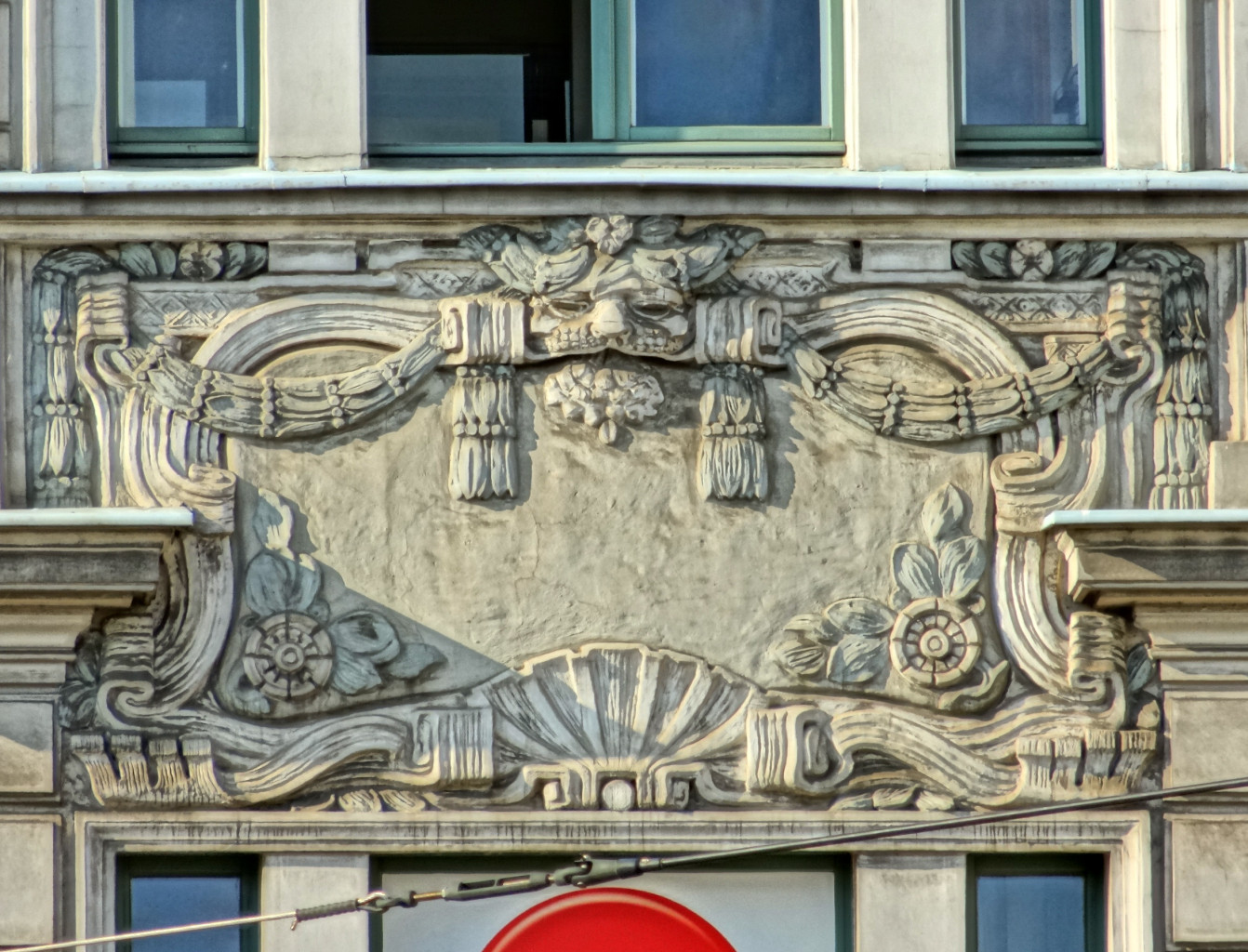
ornamentation

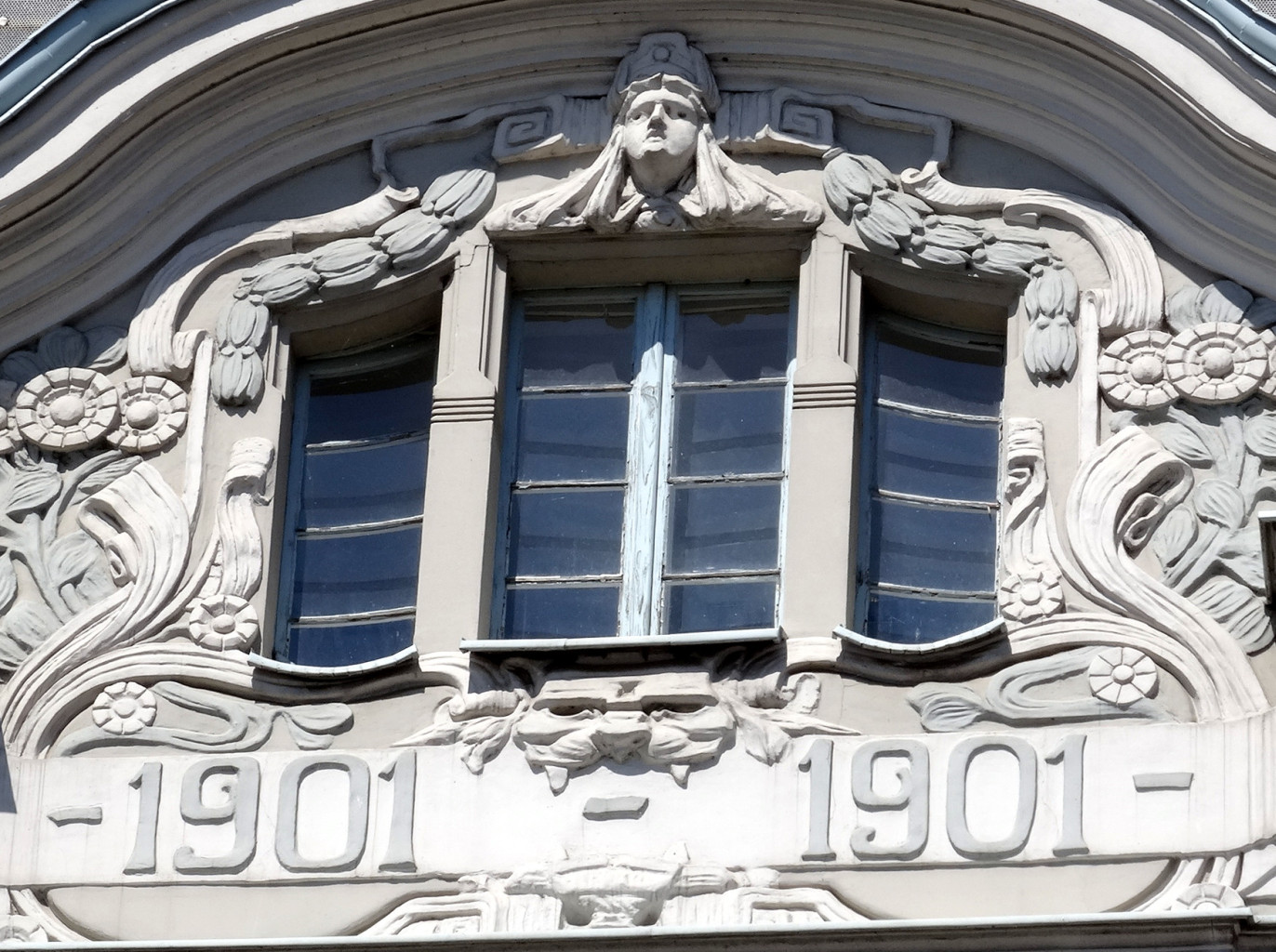
Top pediment

=== Opera Nova at 5 ===
1973–2006, by Józef Chmiel, Andrzej Prusiewicz

International Style

The Opera Nova is one of the most modern theatres in Poland. The rich repertoire includes operas, ballets, operettas and musicals, concerts and performances. Bydgoszcz Opera Festival, gathering opera artists from all over the world, has been organized since 1994.

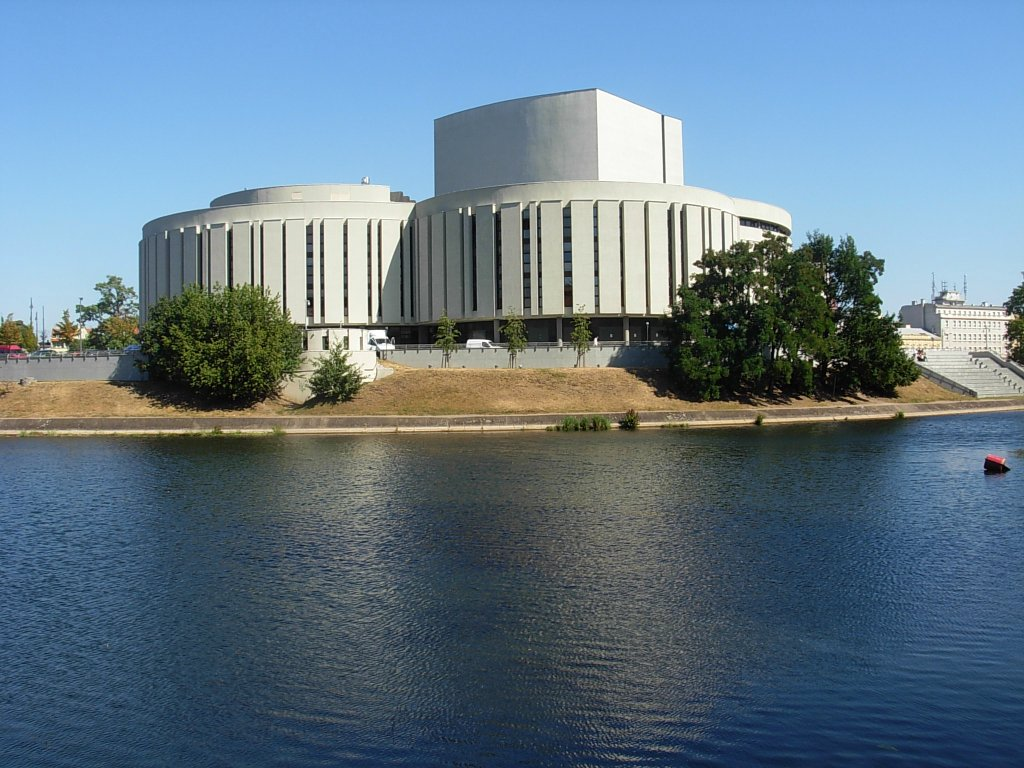
View from Mill Island

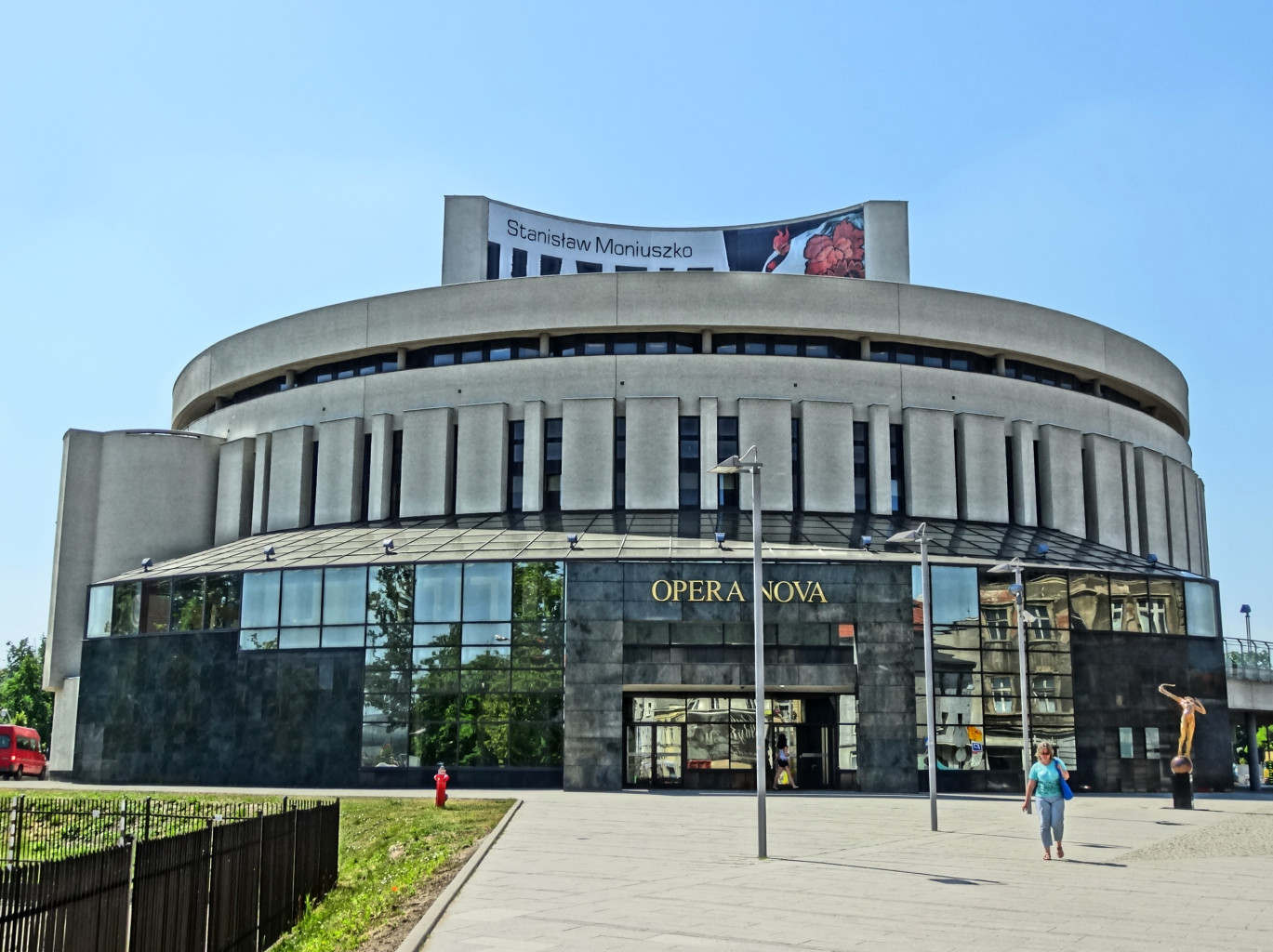
Main entrance on Focha Street

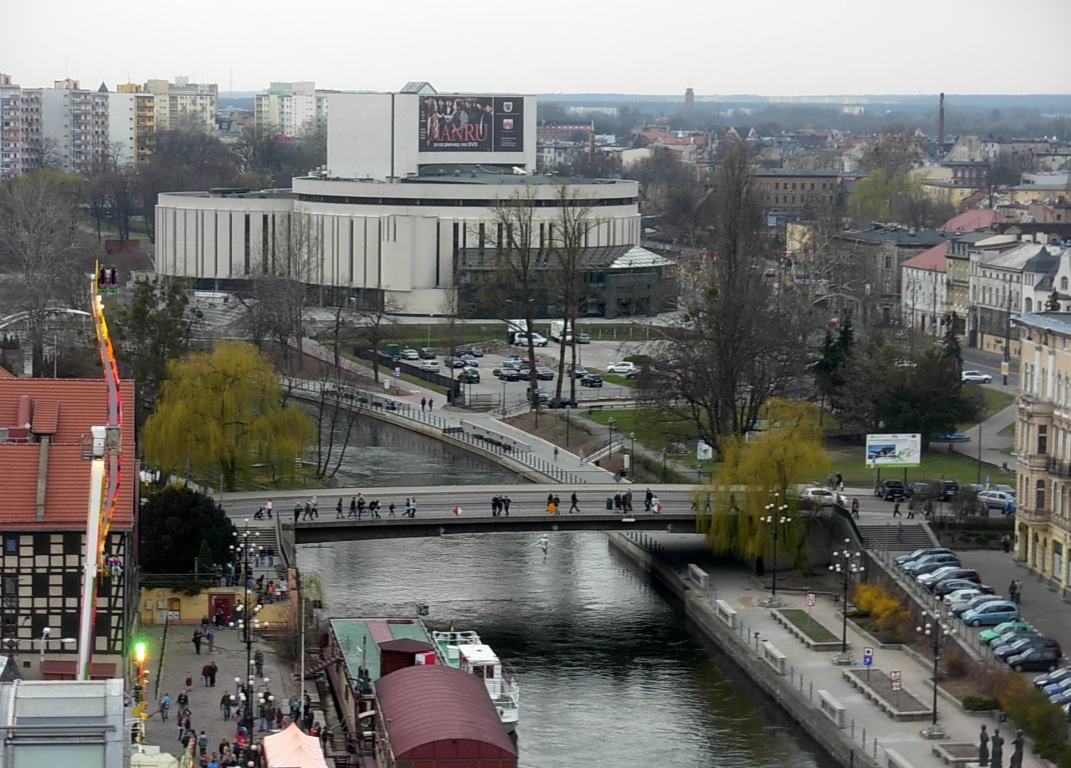
Bird eye view from Grodzka Street

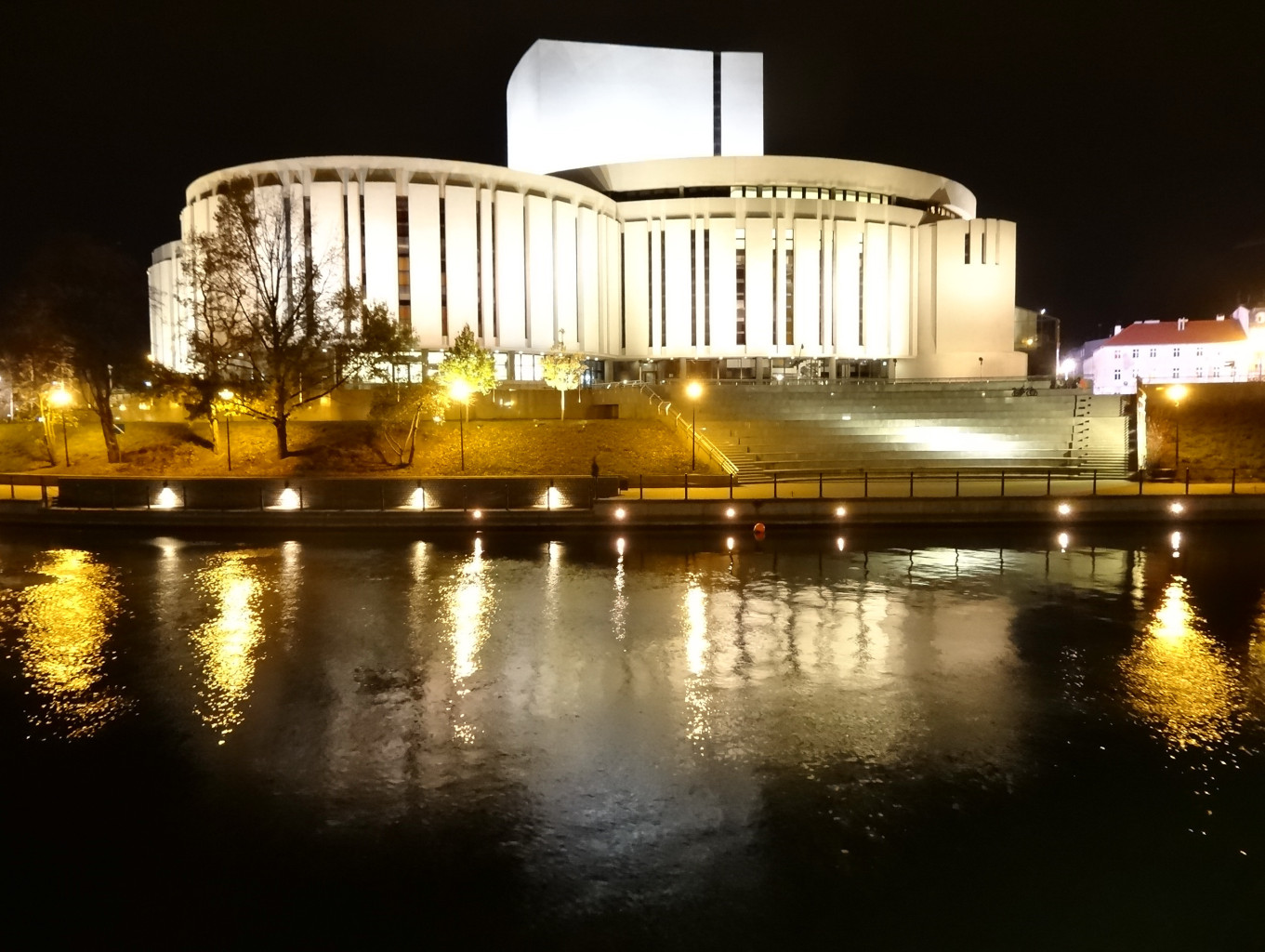
By night

=== Tenement at 6 ===
1825-1850

Neoclassical architecture

The first owner of the house at Wilhelmstraße 16 was a famous printer, Albert Dittmann, local tycoon and successful entrepreneur in Bromberg. His printhouse covered the back yard of Focha 6 and extended through the block to today's building at 13 Dworcowa Street. The company was active until the outbreak of World War II.

The house design is very close to the one at 40 Gdanska Street, built at the same time.

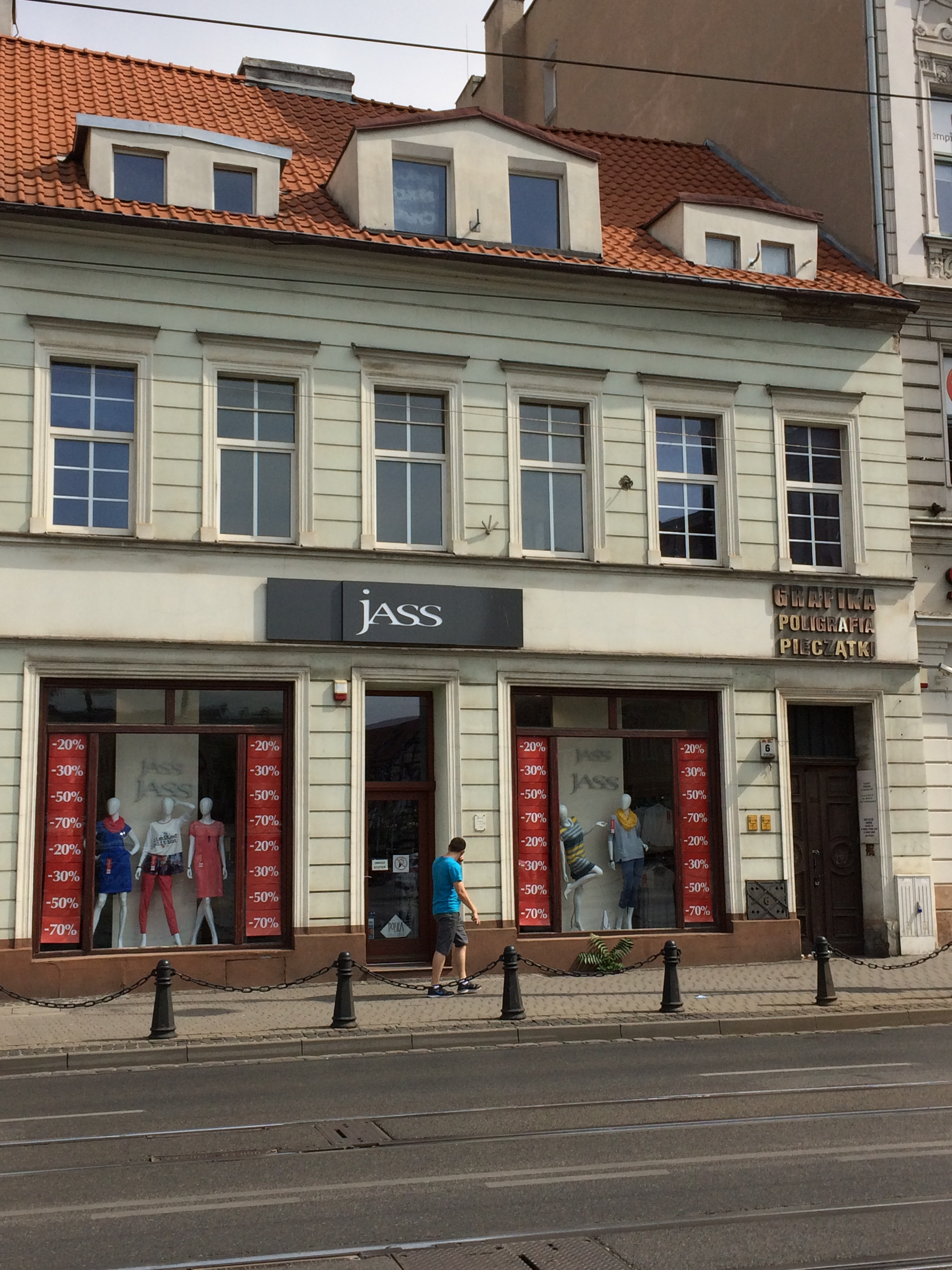
Main elevation from Theatre Square

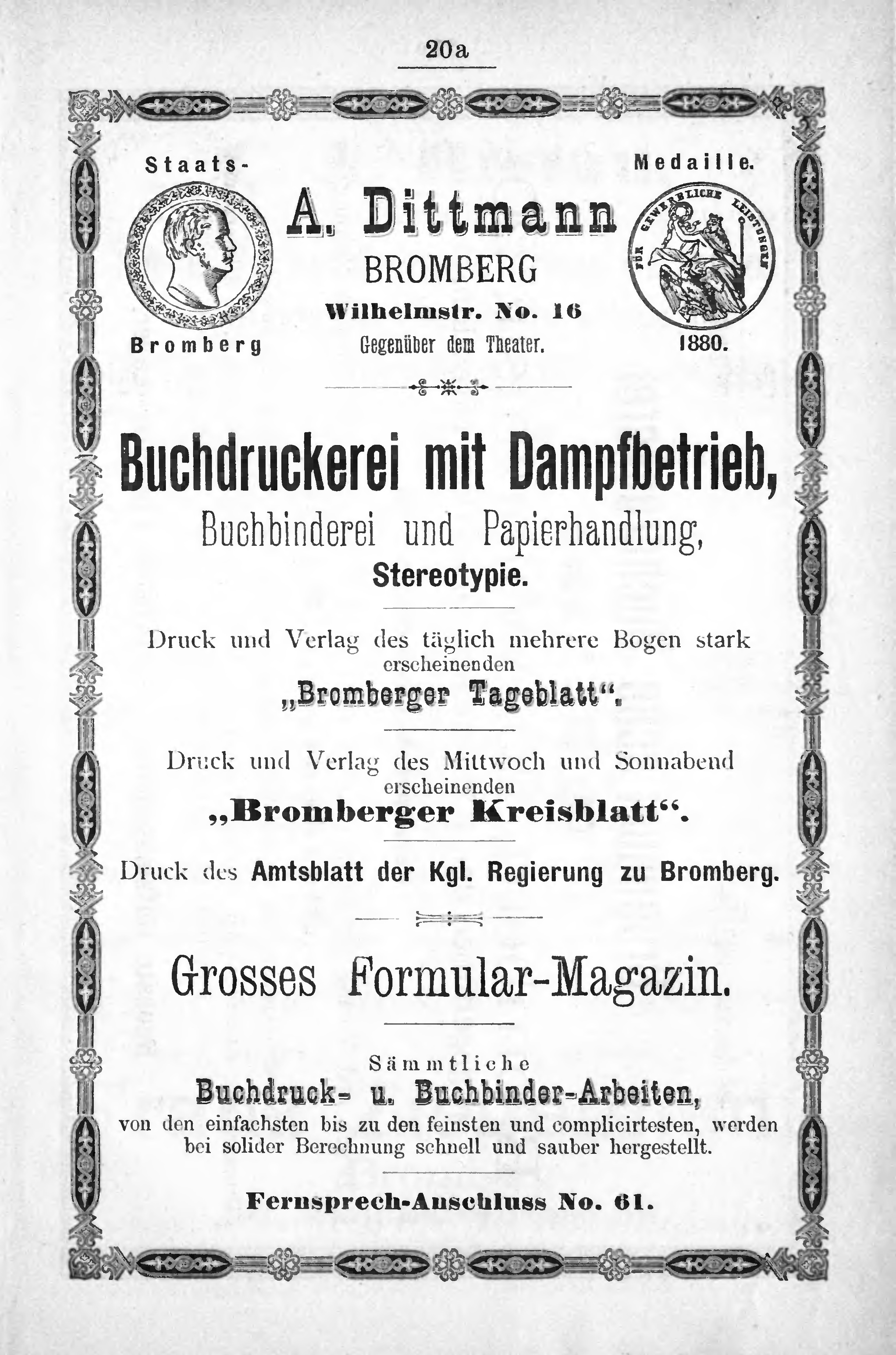
Advertising for Dittmann printhouse, 1890

=== Tenement at 8 ===
1875-1900

Neoclassical architecture

The first owner of the house at Wilhelmstraße 15 was Louis Mallachow, a dentist living at Danzuiger straße 14. Later on, in the 1880s the building became the property of Theodore Joop, a famous photograph who had its workshop there. His firm survived his death, taken over by Paul Nawrotzki and Emil Wehr.

The frontage displays typical neo-classical architectural features.

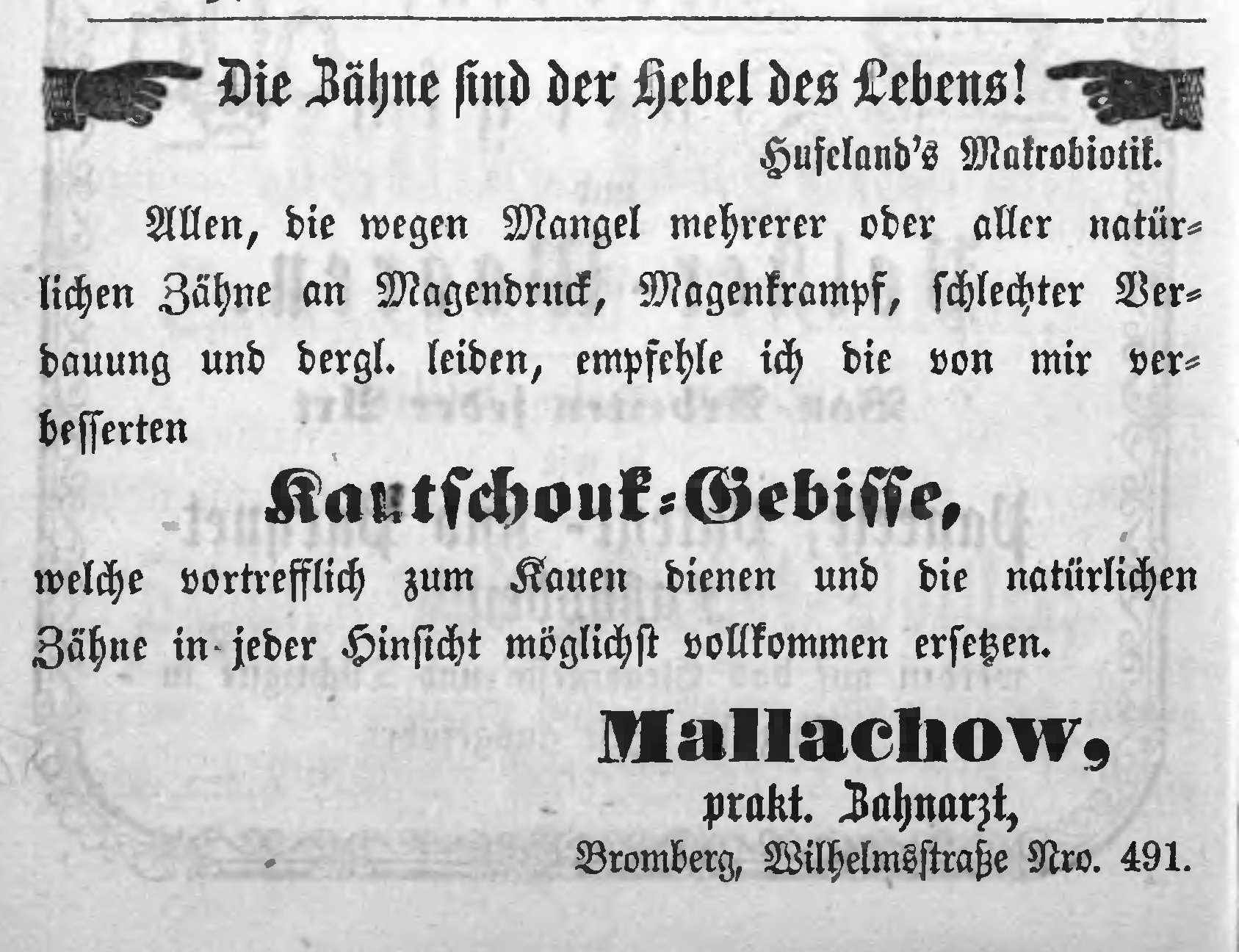
Advertisement for Dr. Mallachow in 1864

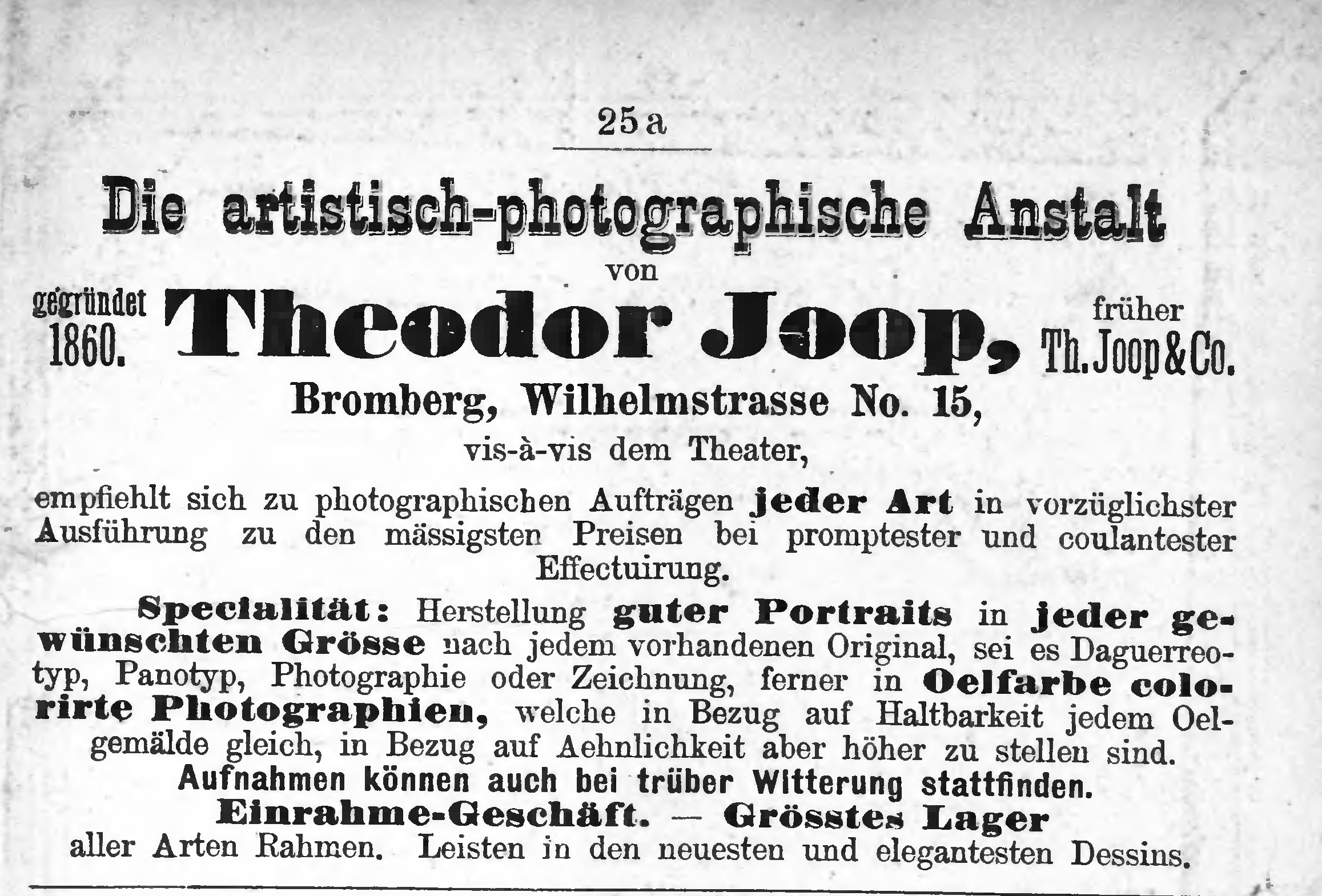
Advertising for Th. Joop in 1890

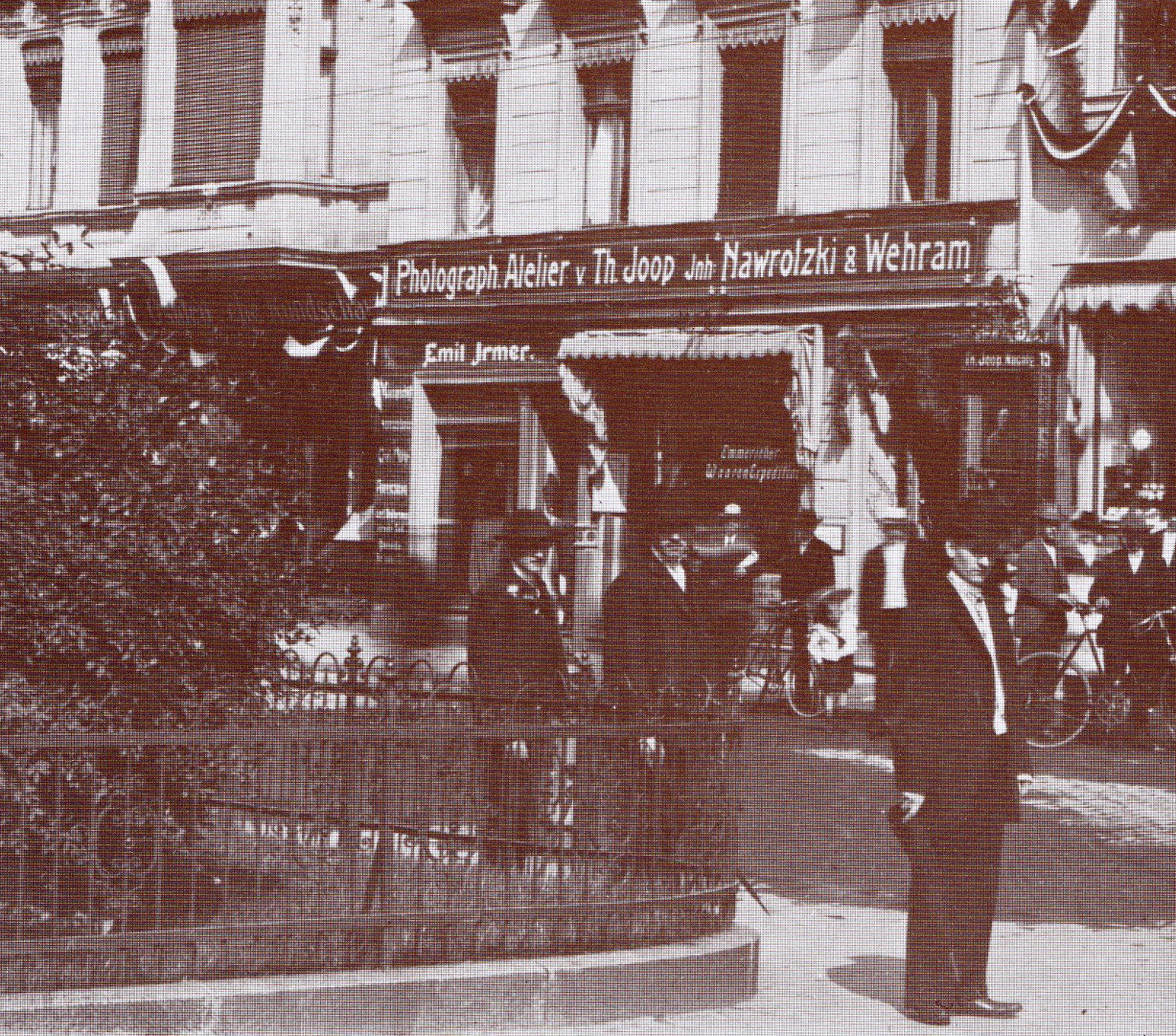
Joop workshop at Nr.8 in 1907

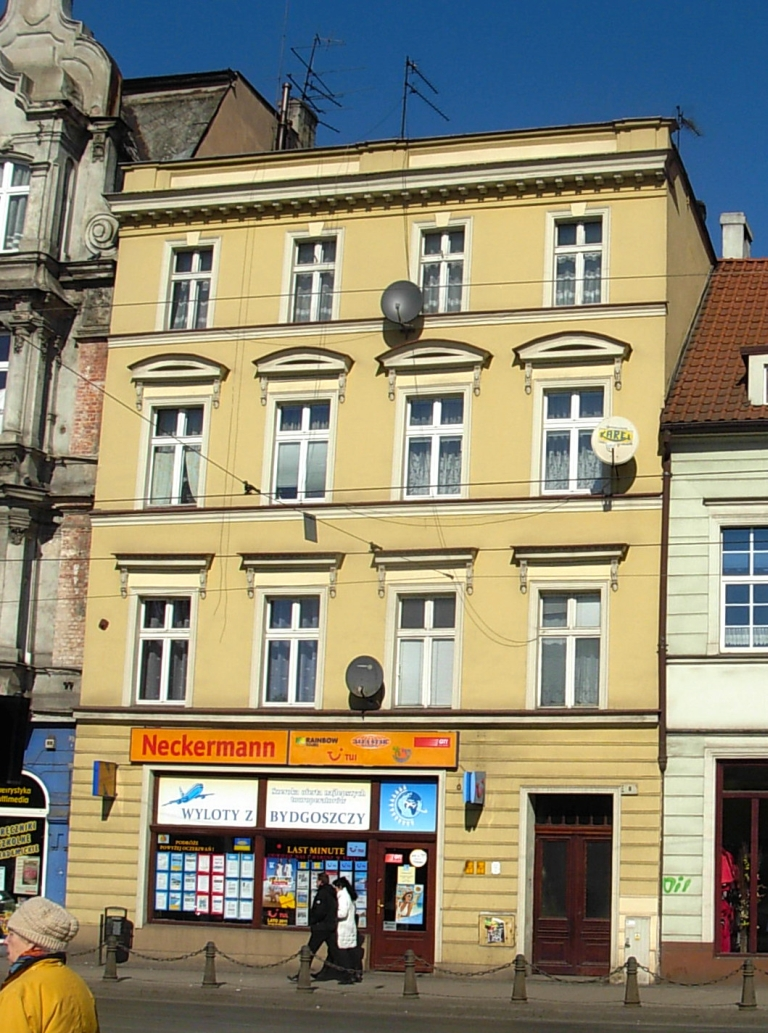
Elevation on the street

=== Tenement at 10 ===
ca 1900

Vienna Secession & Eclecticism

In 1880, Heinrich Castner, a restaurateur, opened a beer hall in this place. Franz Tomaszewski, a baker, owned this building, then located at Wilhelmstraße 14, from 1882 till World War I.

Main elevation bears profound features of Eclecticism with bay windows, adorned dormers on the gable. Decoration is very delicate, comprising arched pediments flanking a niche crowned by a cherub face on the first floor, a second niche is also present on the second floor. Everywhere, scrollworks with vegetal motifs are present, as well as adornment on dormers and bay windows.

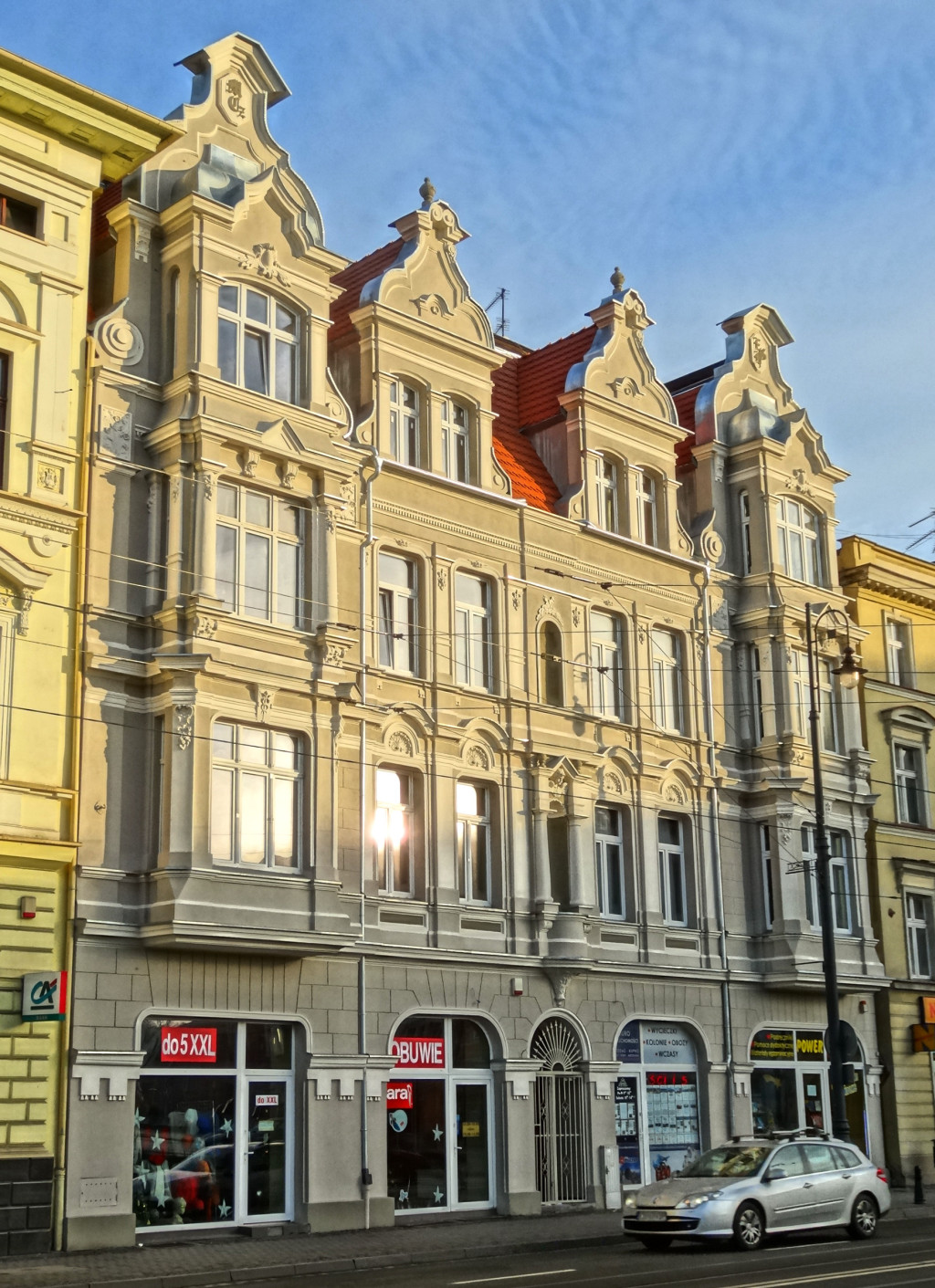
View from the street

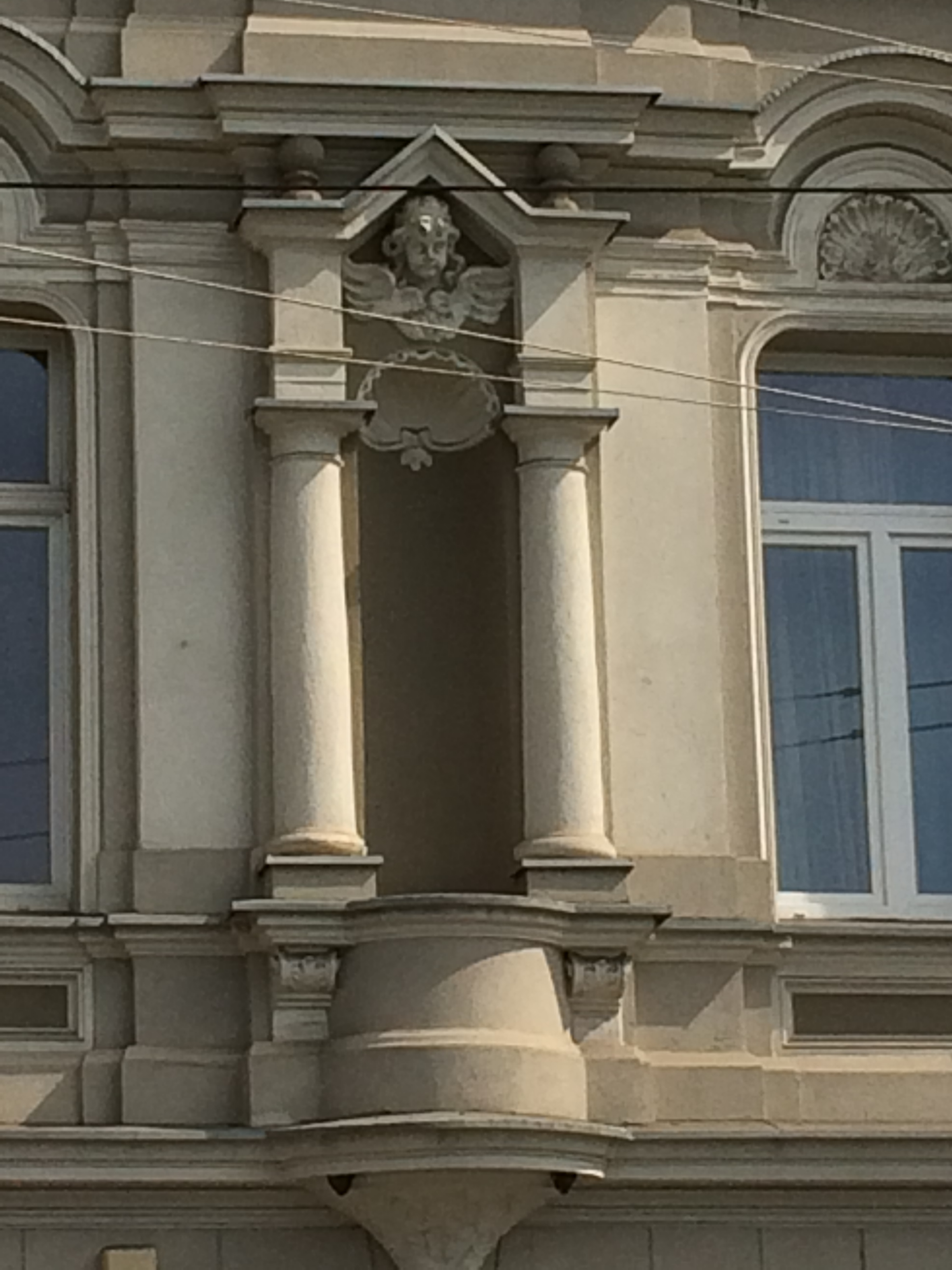
Niche detail

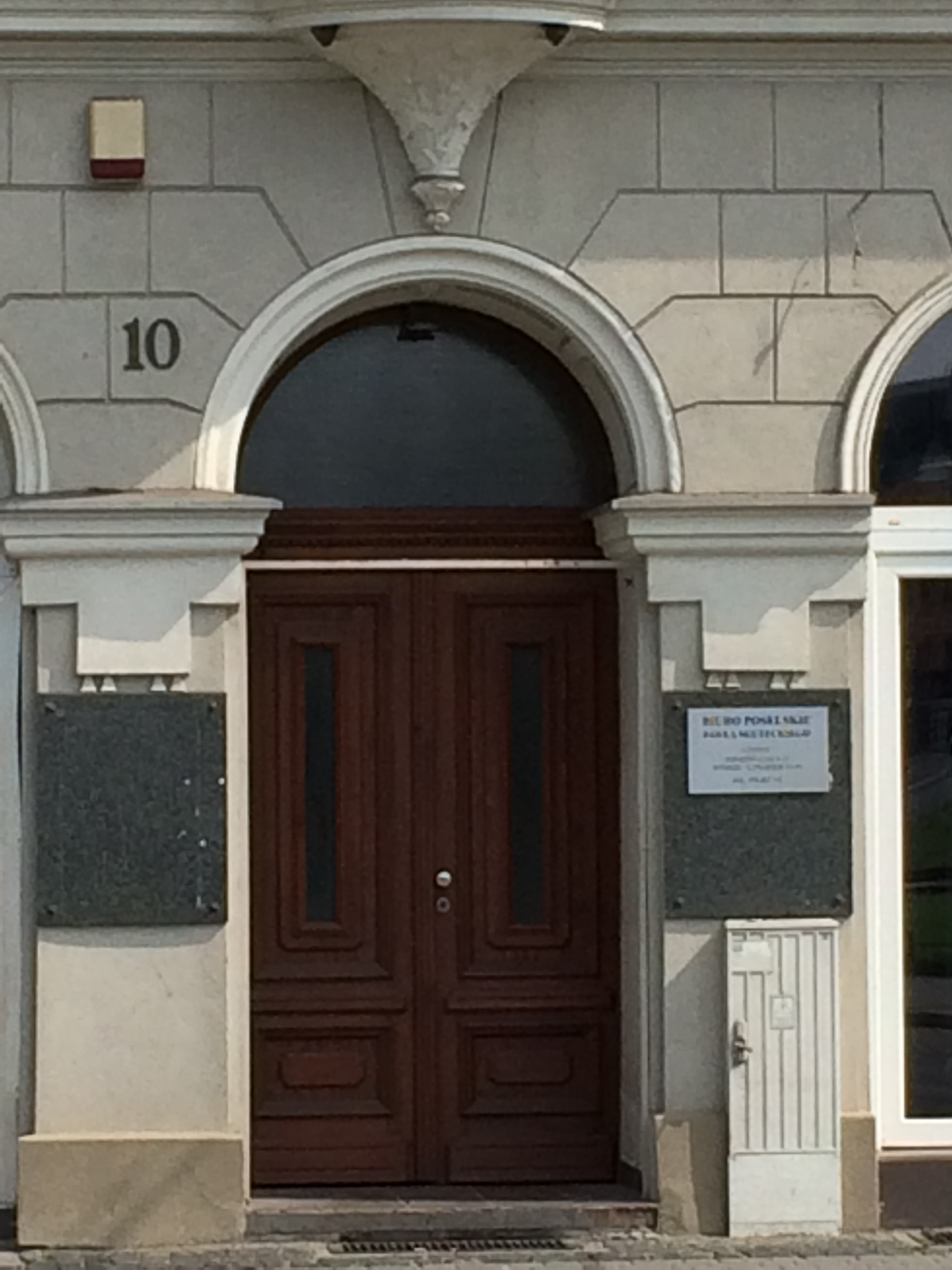
Main Gate

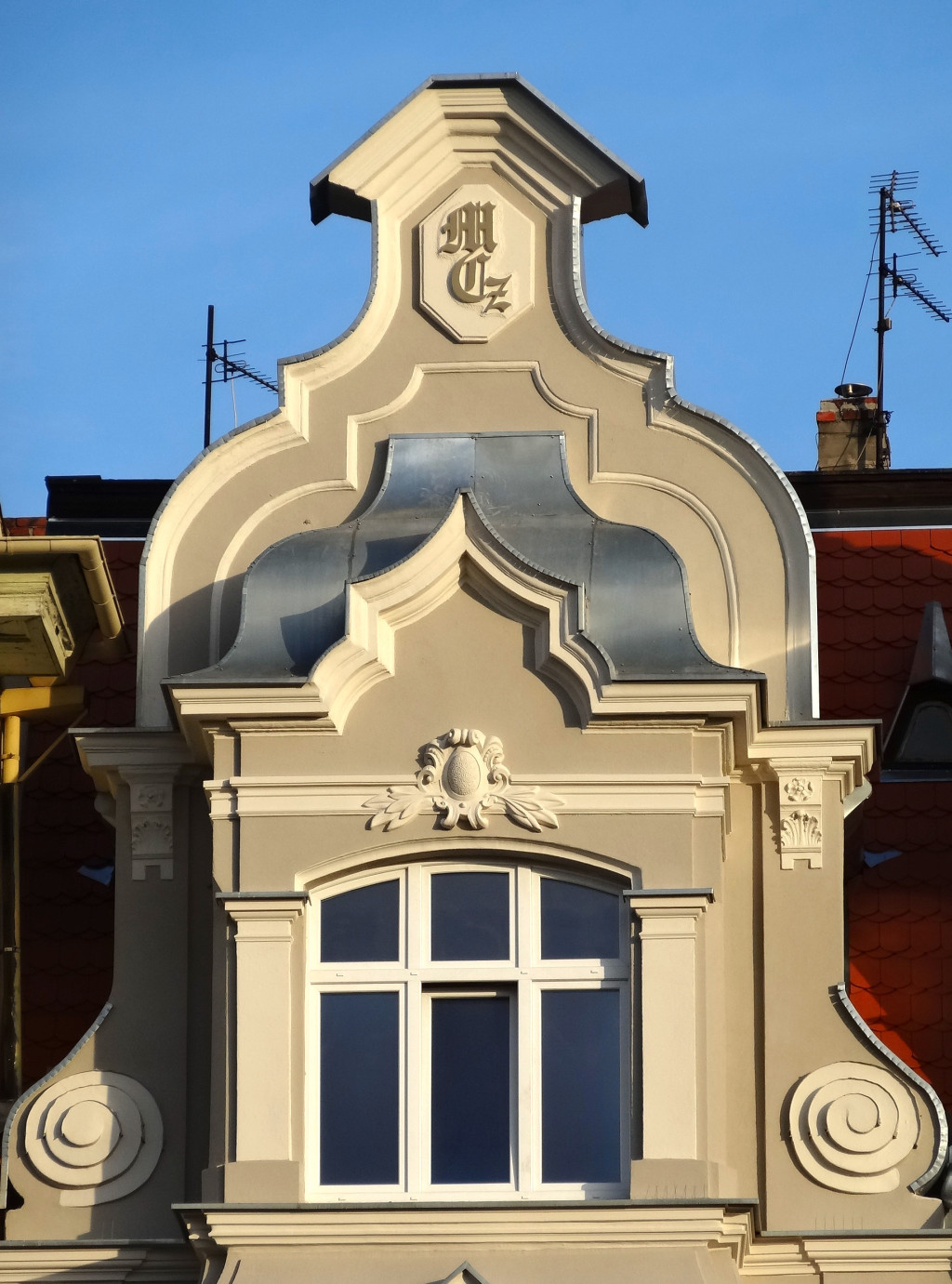
Detail of a dormer

=== Tenement at 12 ===
1879

Eclecticism & Neo-Renaissance

Otto Christian Ludwig Bollmann was the first owner this building in the 1880s, then located at Wilhelmstraße 13. He was a merchant, owner of a brickyard located in Ritterstraße (now Rycerska Street). Afterwards, the place housed a bank (Bromberger Bank) in the 1910s.

The facade has neo-renaissance features, with pediment bearing a bas-relief woman figure in a cartouche, hanged by vegetal garlands on the first floor. The most striking element is the grand bay window parting the frontage and towering the entry gate: it has almost classical characteristics with fake columns, triangular pediment and four allegoric bas-reliefs.

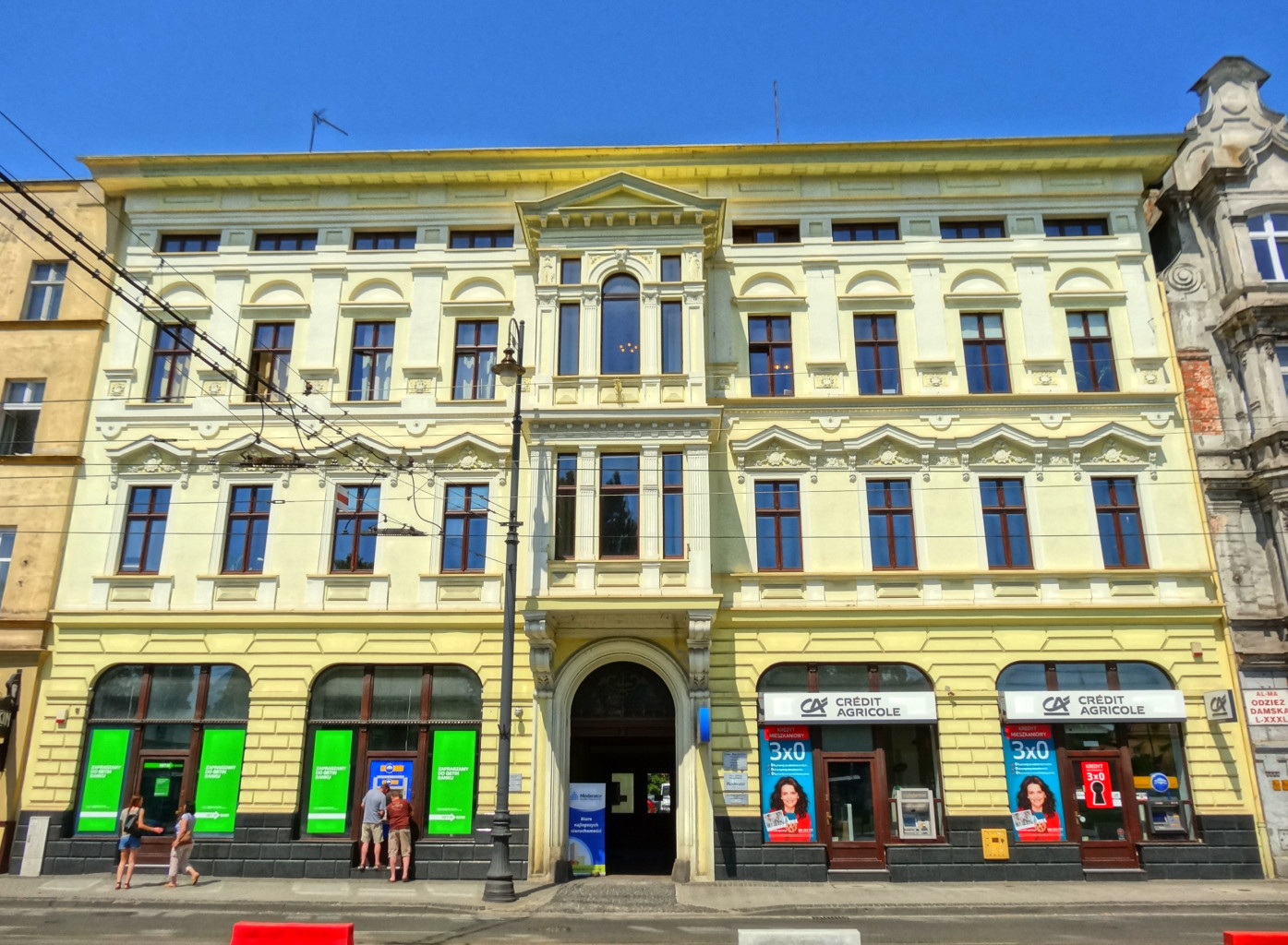
Main elevation

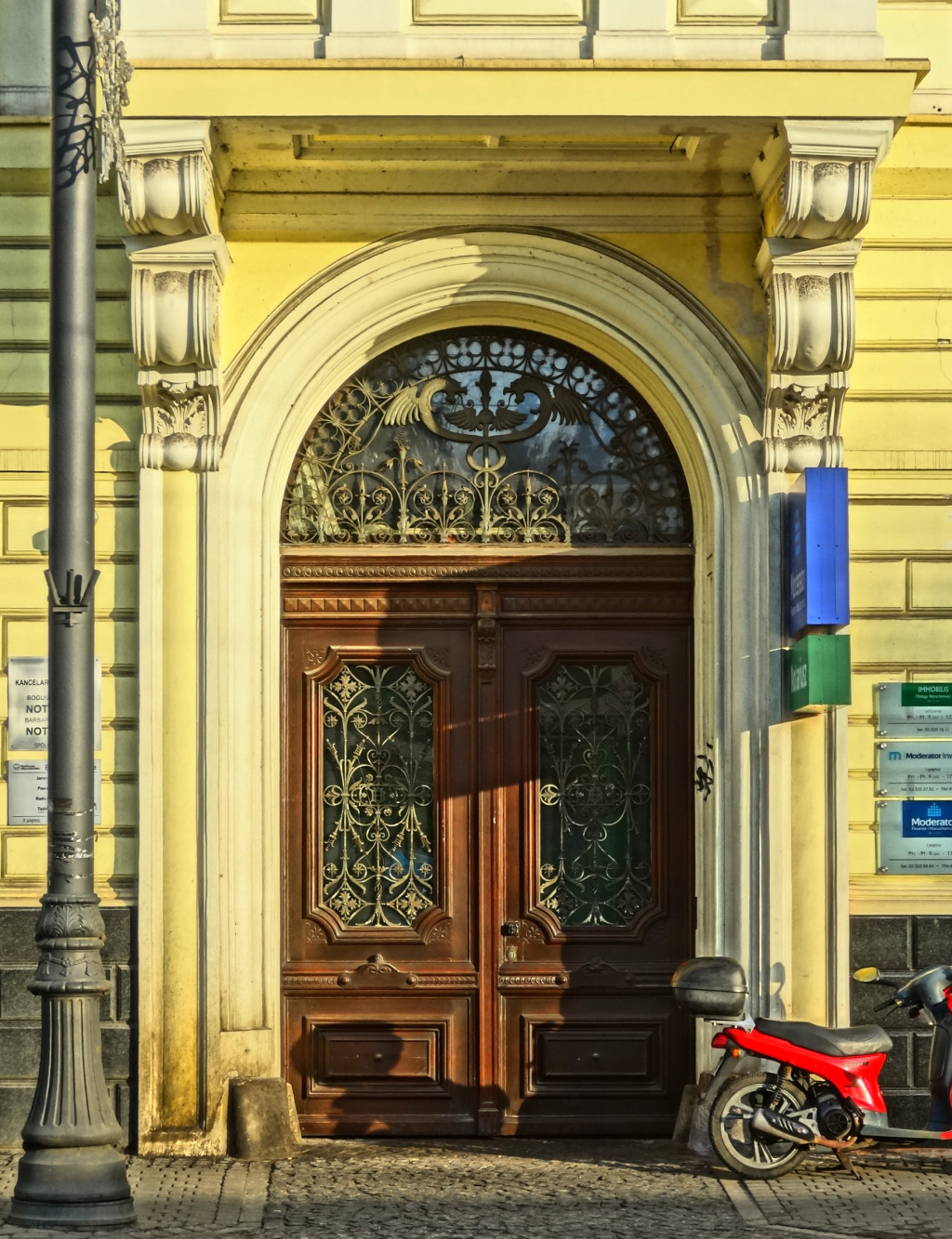
Detail of the gate

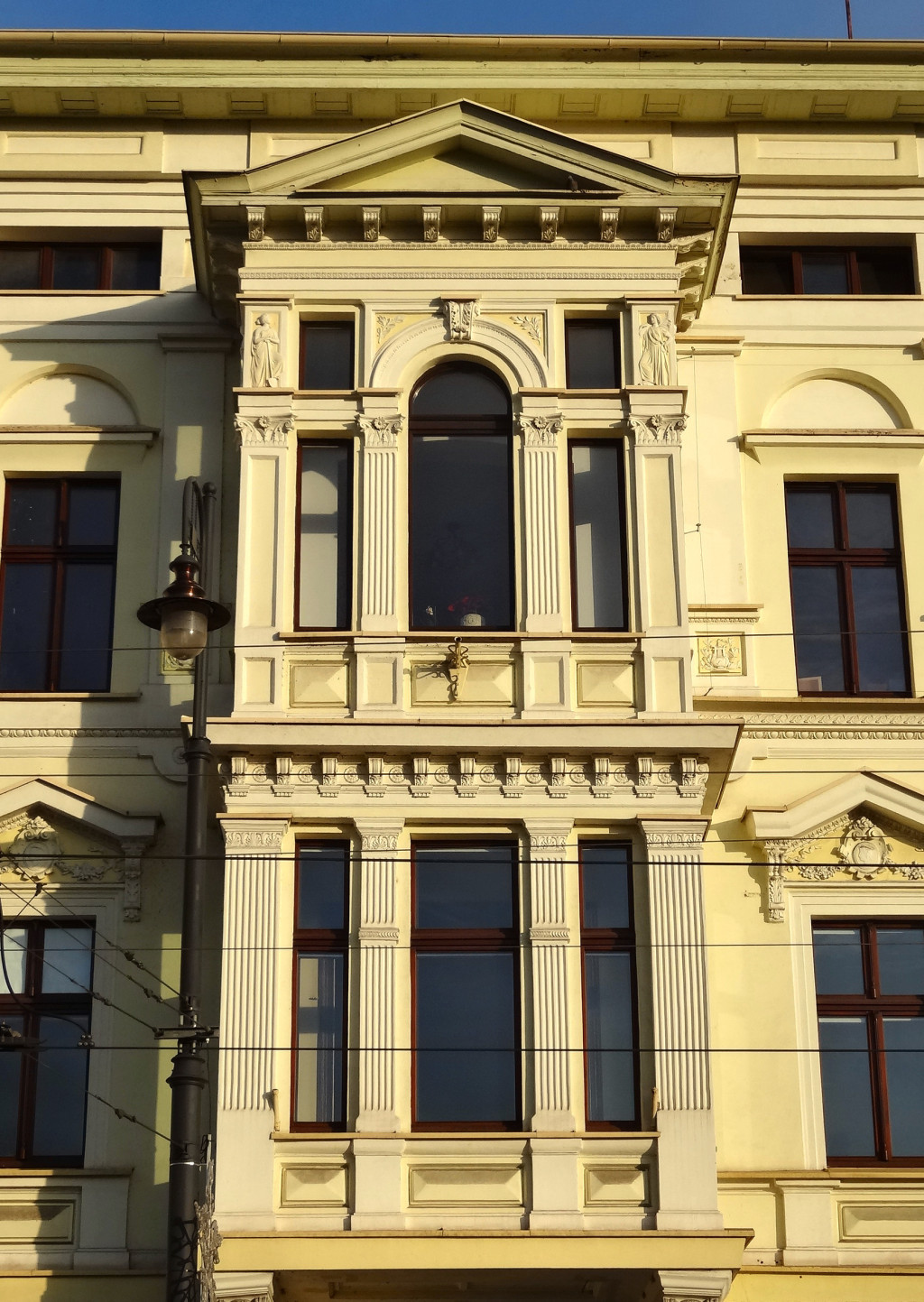
Detail of the bay window

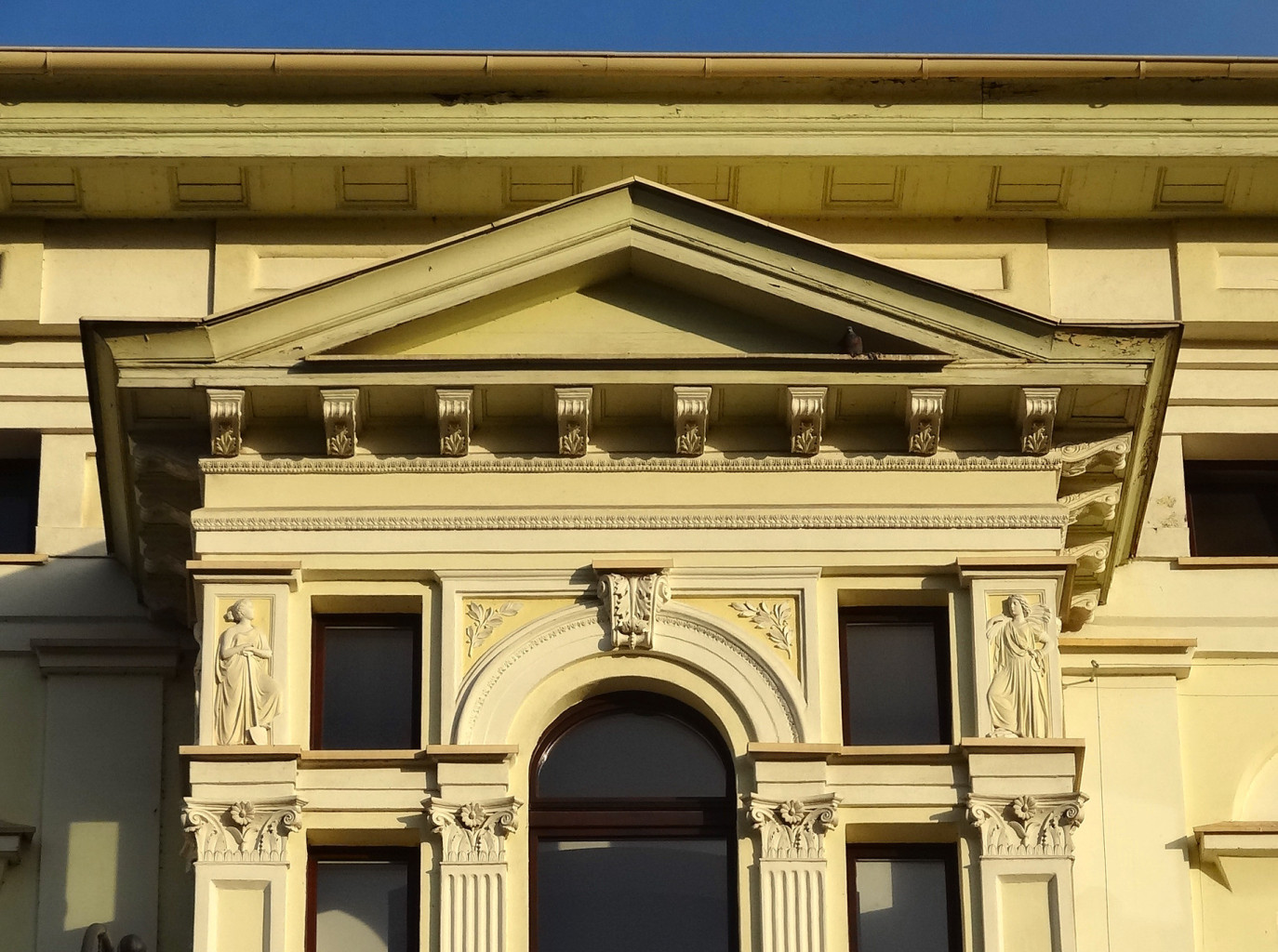
Pediment and two allegoric bas-reliefs

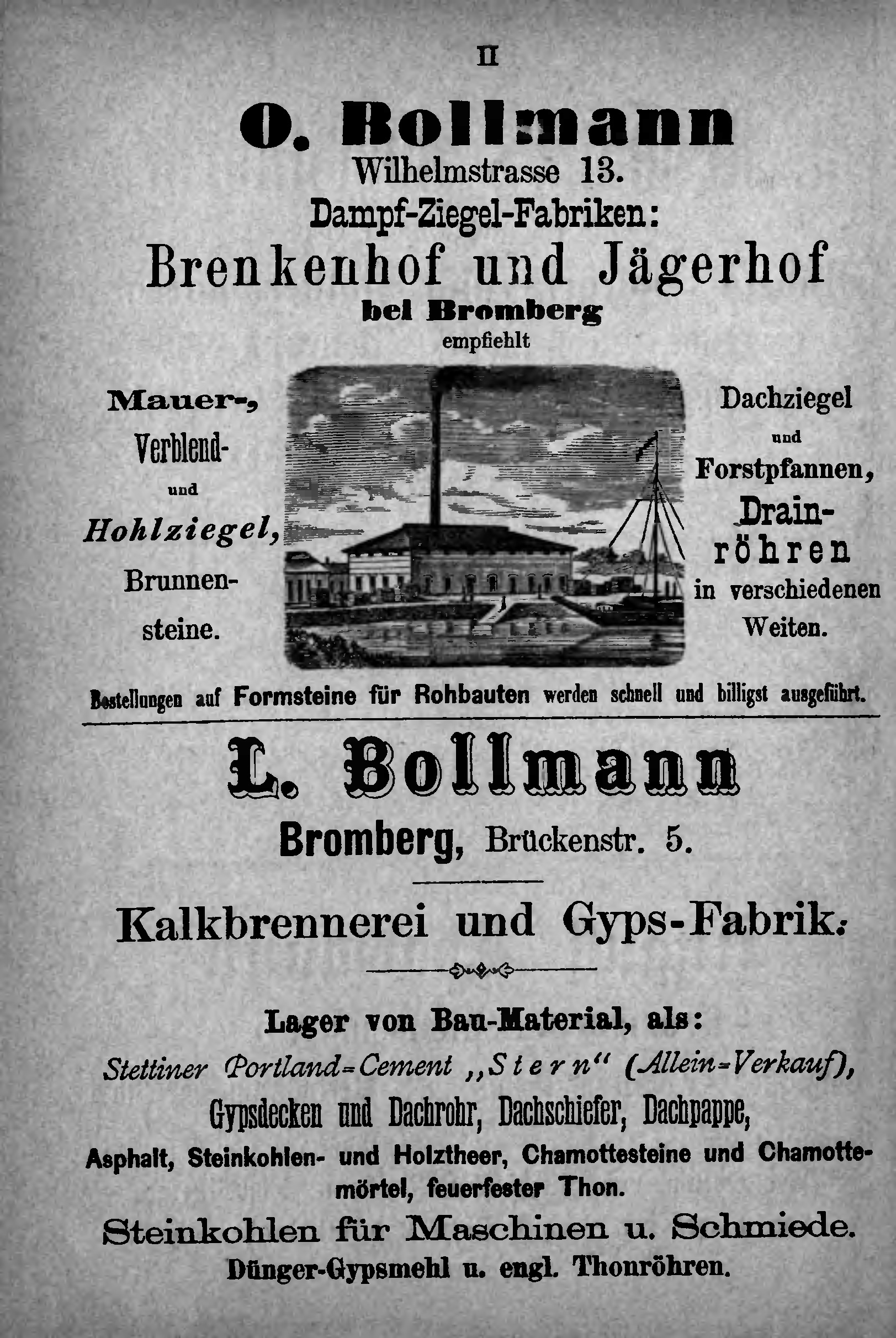
Advertising for Bollmann Firm in 1880

=== Tenement at 14 ===
1885, by A. Berndt

Neo-Renaissance

Albert Pallatsch, a restaurateur in Rinkauerstraße and Bahnhoffstraße in the 1900s, opened there a café-restaurant named Pilsener Hütte(1908), then Rheingold (1915). Initial address was Wilhelmstraße 12

The facade has lost all its decoration with time.

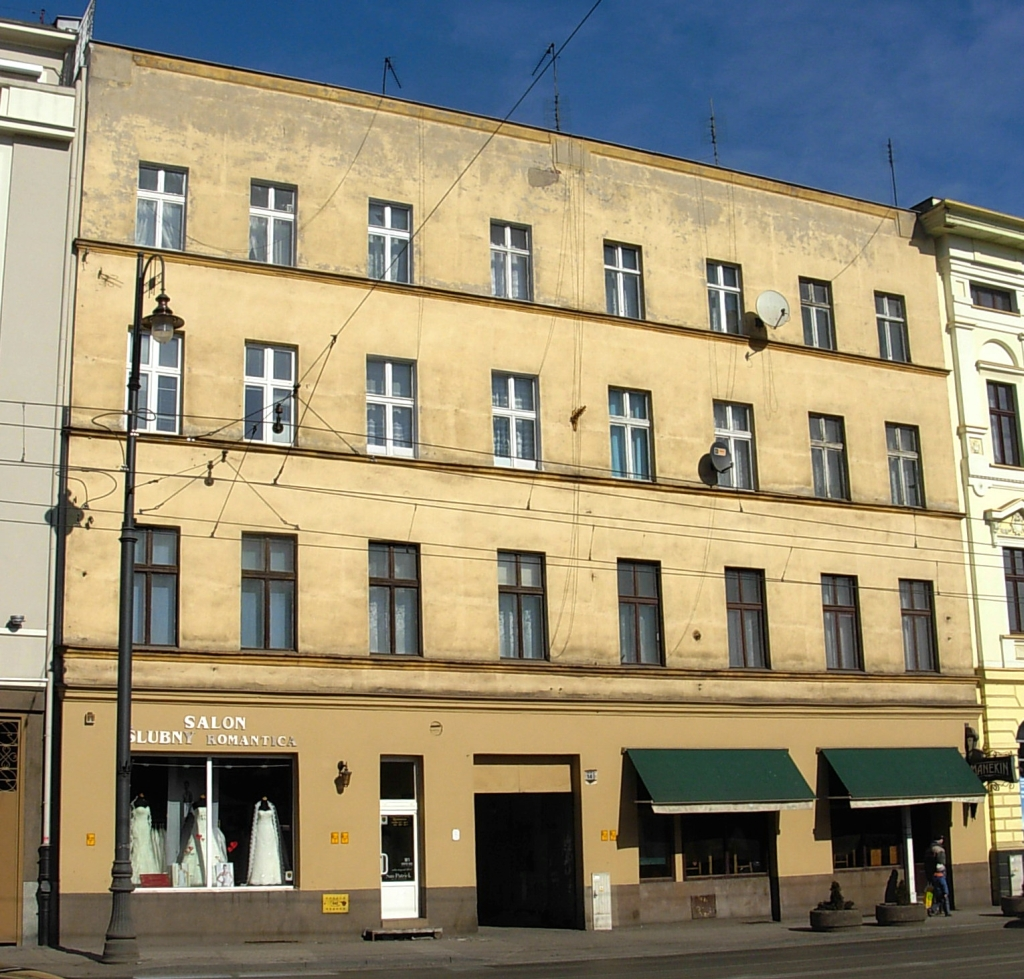
Main elevation

=== Tenement at 16 ===
1879

International Style

In this house lived Anton Hoffmann, from 1877 to 1880: he was a master mason and an architect very active in downtown Bydgoszcz during the second half of the 19th century. Part of his achievements are tenements or houses at Śniadecki Street 31, Pomorska Street 21 or Długa street 3. The actual building houses the company PS-SA (Polish: Polskie Sieci Elektroenergetyczne - Północ S.A.).

The facade has lost its decor following several refurbishments, only the top baluster railing has been preserved.

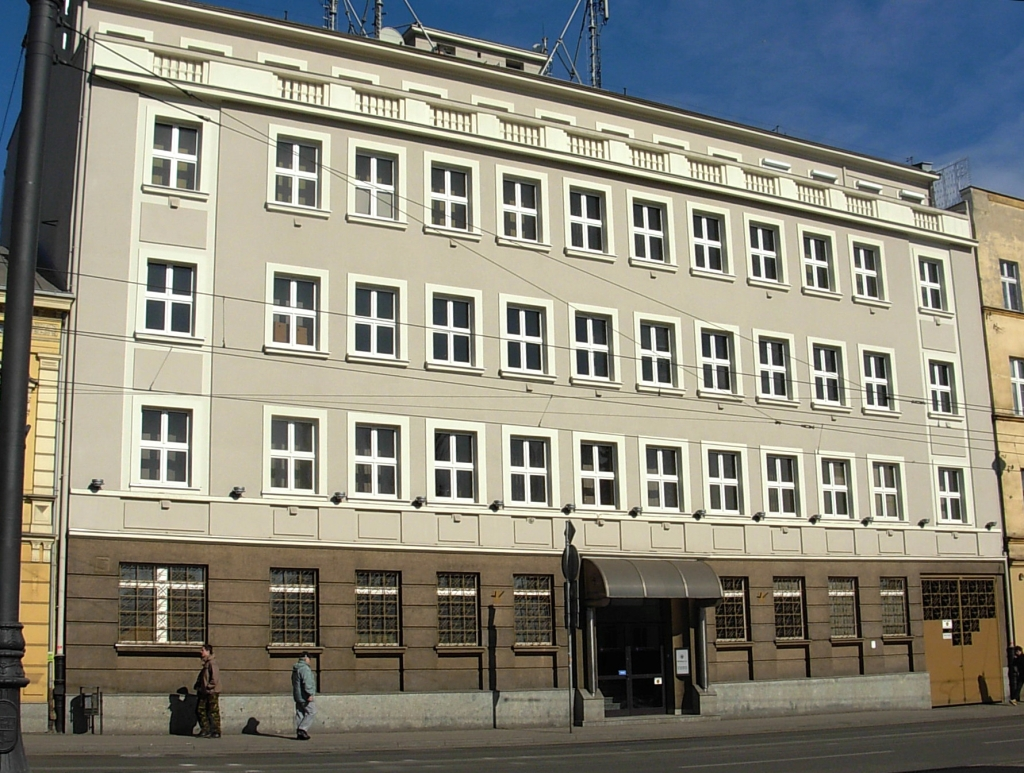
Main elevation

=== Tenement at 18 ===
1850–1875, by A. Berndt

Eclecticism & Neo-Renaissance

David Woythaler moved its tobacco factory to this location, then Wilhelmstraße 10, in the 1880s. He owned the villa at today's 2 Paderewskiego Street. In 1907, Bromberg plant was one of the largest manufacturers of snuff tobacco in Prussia. Once the factory closed in the early 1920s, the place became the National Printhouse T.A.(Polish: Drukarnia Narodowa T.A.). Brick buildings of the original factory are still preserved in the back of the plot.

Recently renovated, the facade displays an elegant balance, topped by a roof with parapet: pedimented windows are separated by adorned pilasters, a scrollwork frieze crowns the elevation.

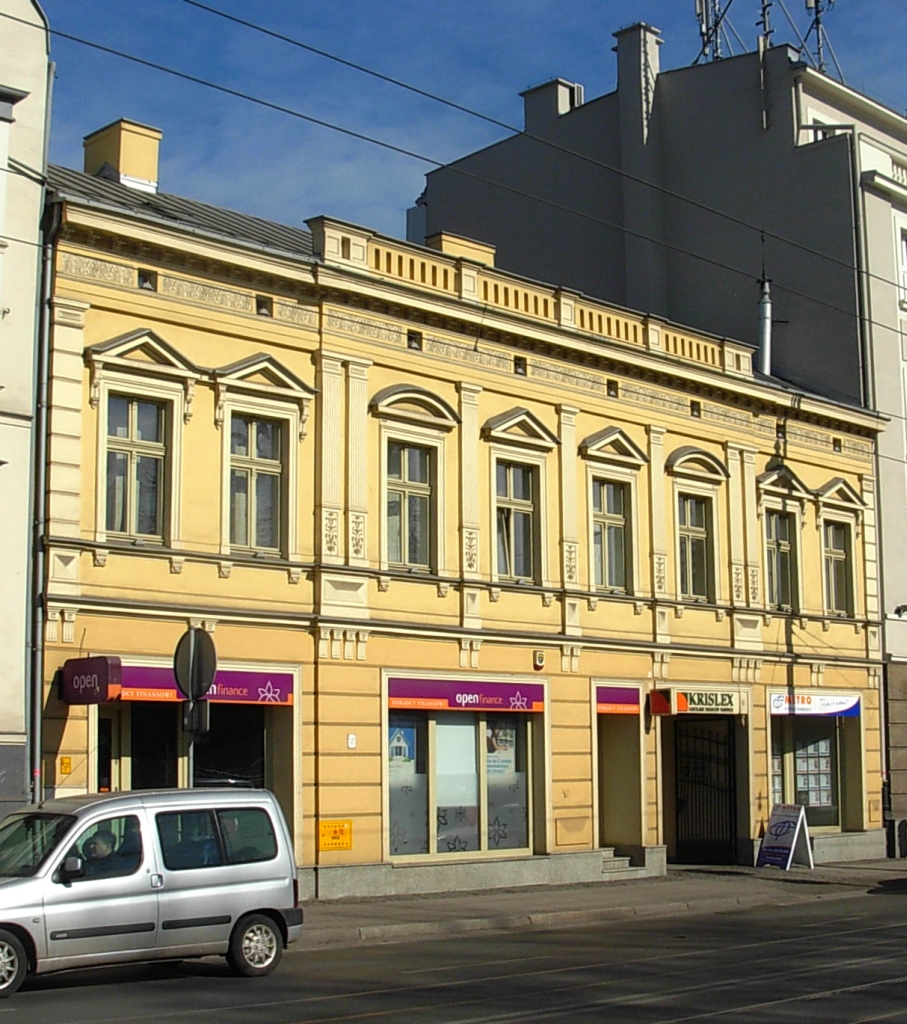

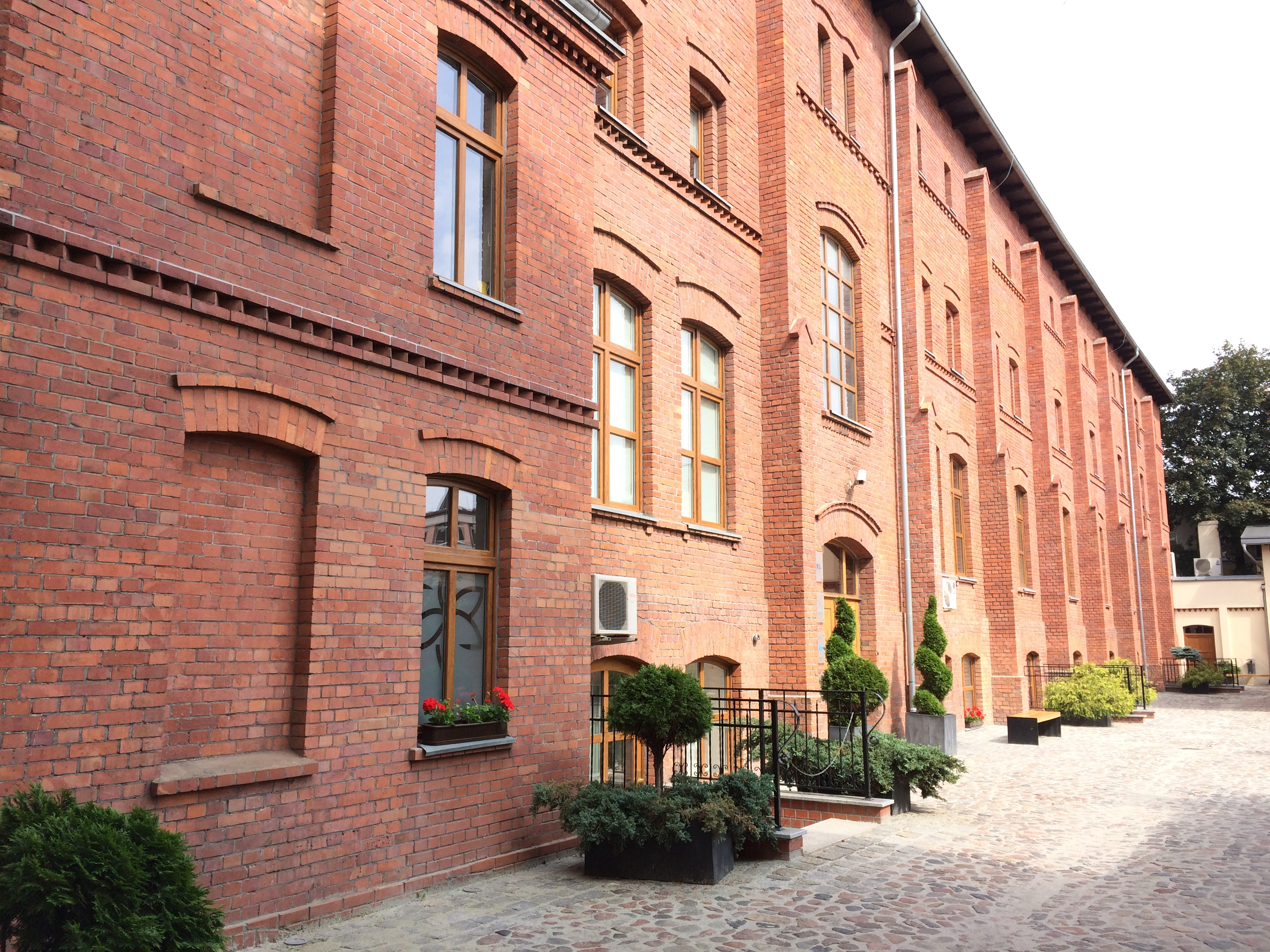
Backyard buildings

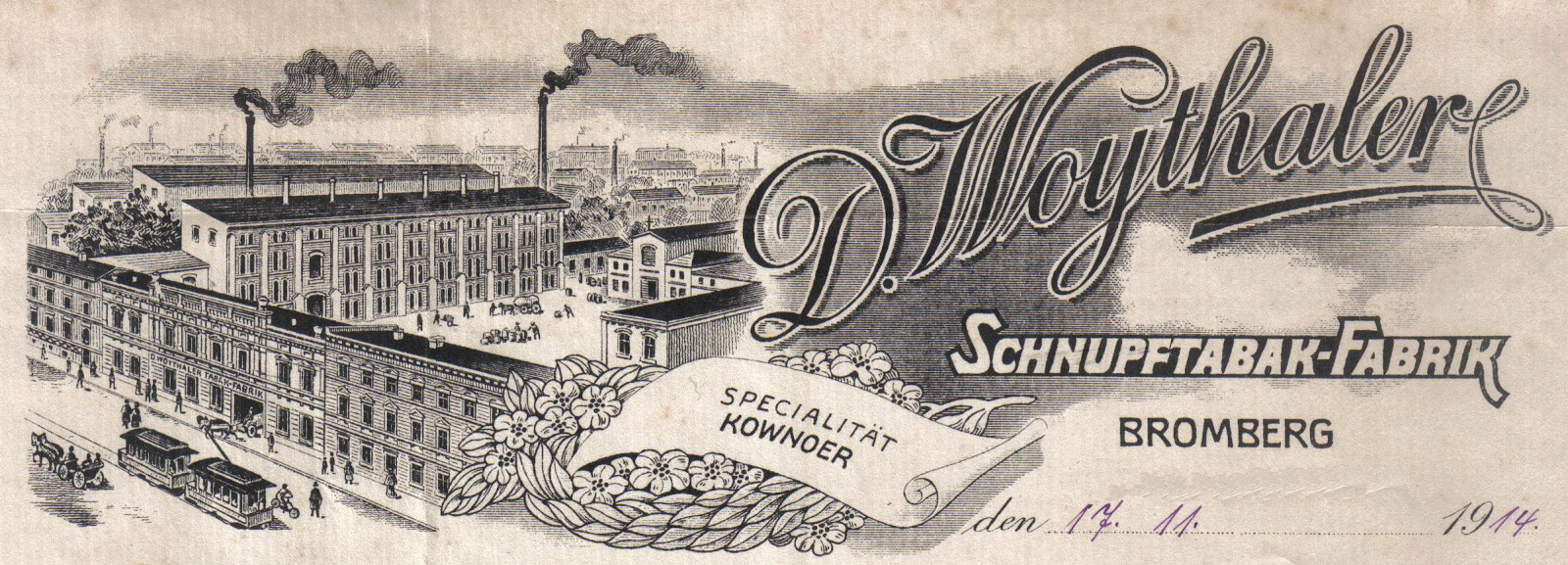
The tobacco factory on a 1914 invoice

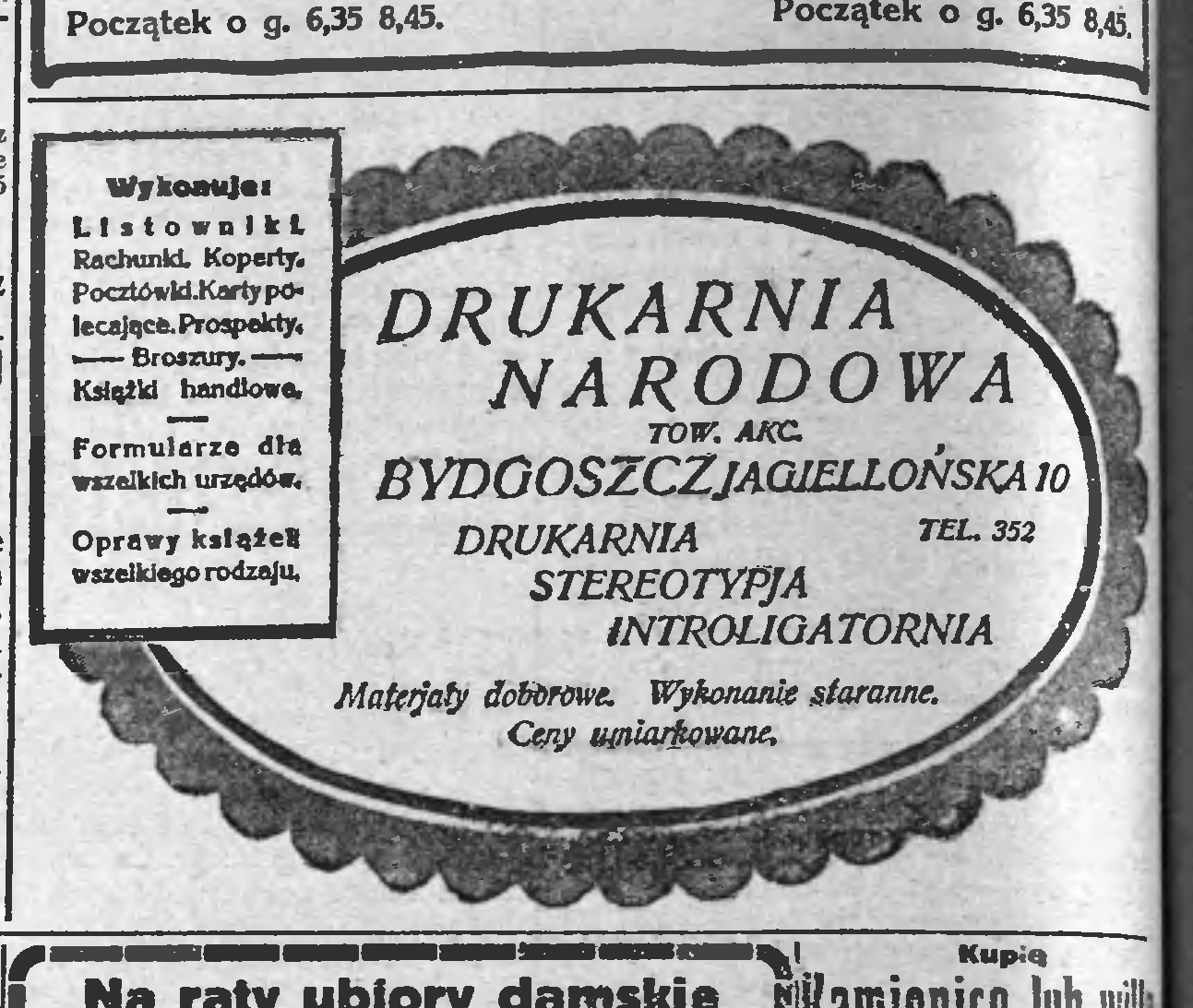
Advertising for Drukarnia Narodowa in 1923

=== Tenement at 20 ===
1850-1875

German Historicism

Johann Lindner, a rentier was the first owner of the building at Wilhelmstraße 9 in the late 1870s. The tenement has been renovated in 2007 and converted in 2014 into a four-star hotel Mercure Sepia (90 rooms) with a panoramic roof terrace (85 seats), parking (it opened officially on January 16, 2015).

The facade has a large bay window, but most worthy noticing is its roof: on a small area are displayed a hipped dormer window in the middle, a small tented roof on the left and a curve shape gable dormer on the left.

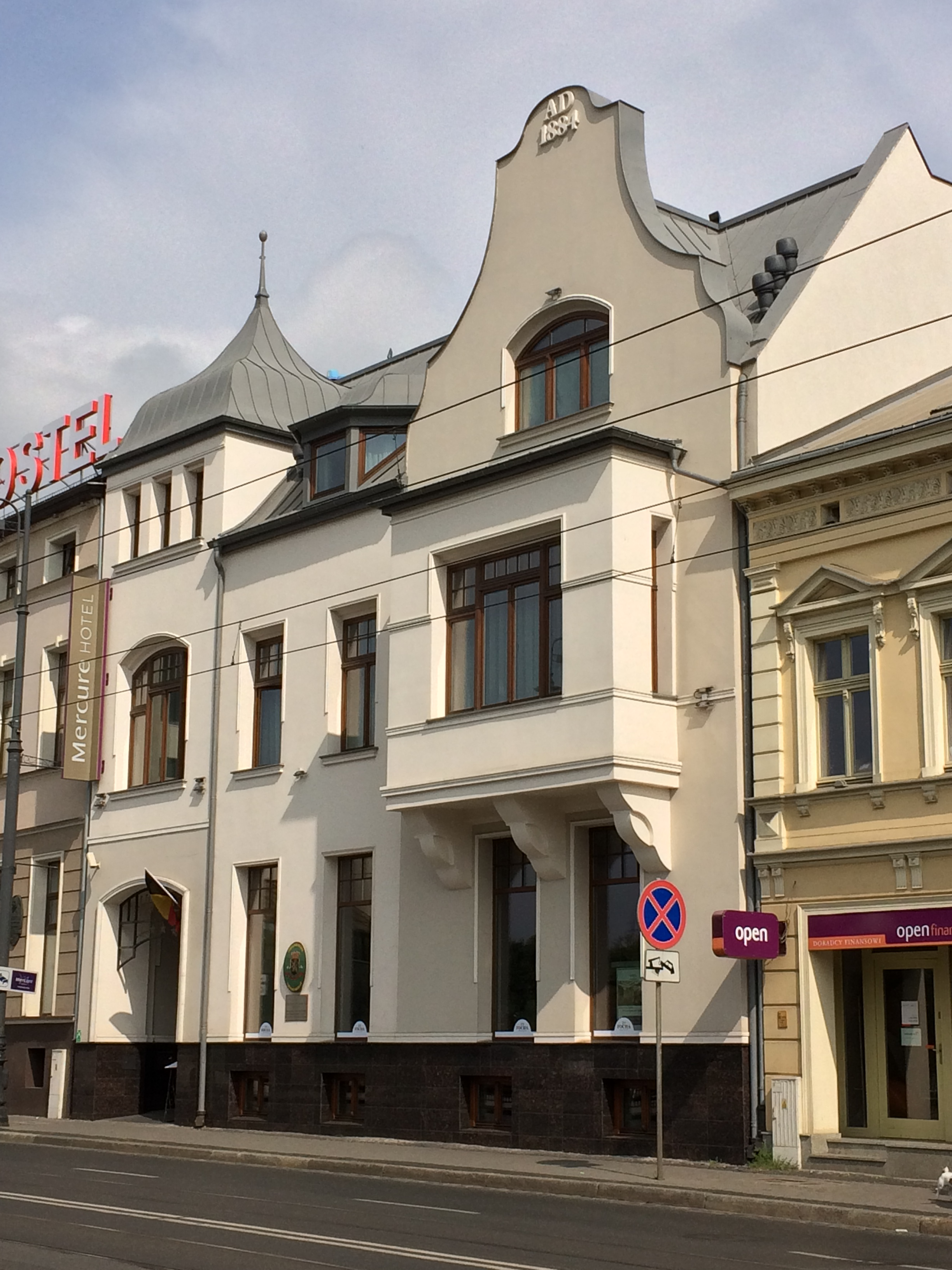
Main elevation

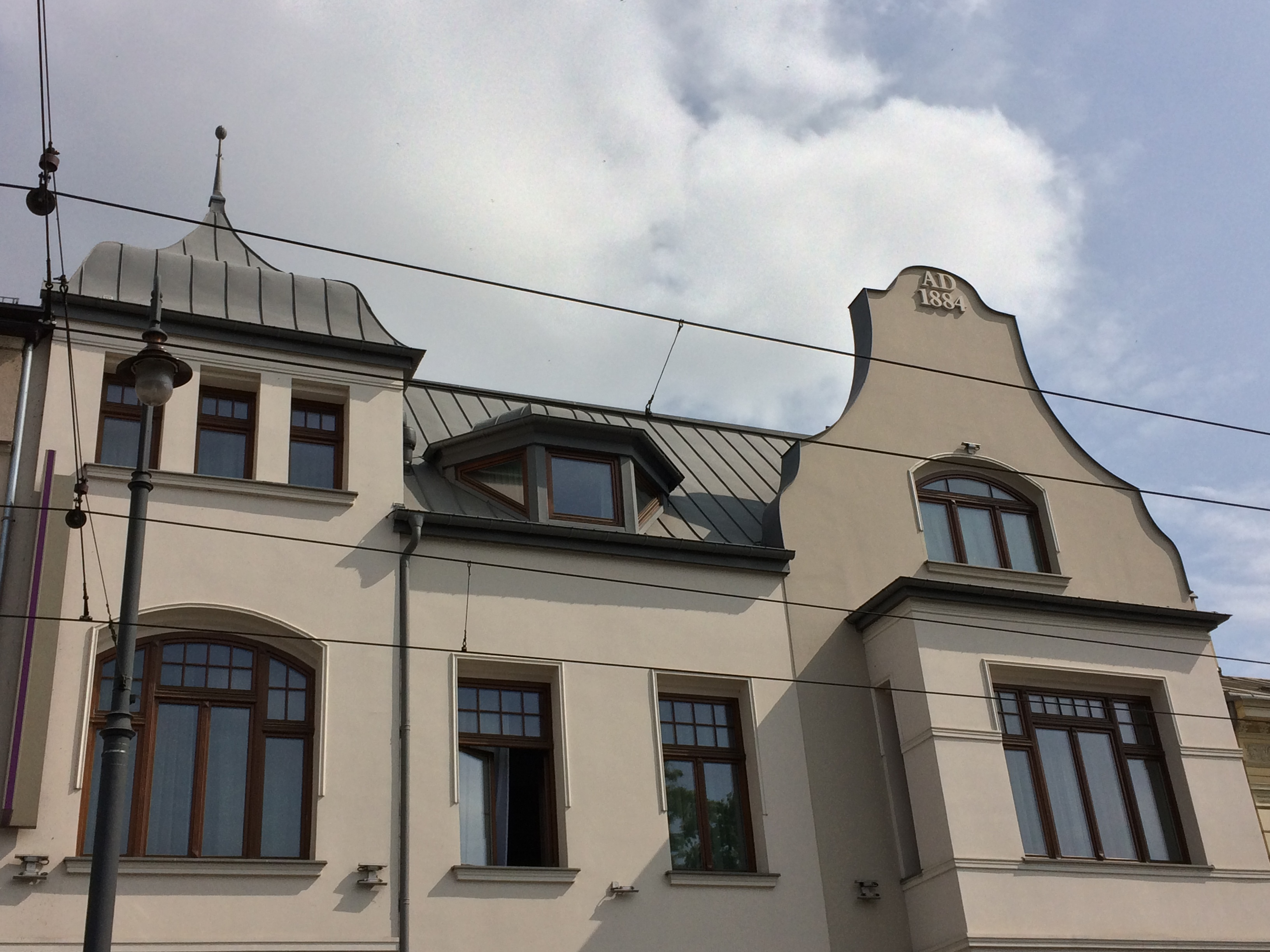
Detail of the gable

=== Tenement at 22 ===
1850-1875

International Style

J G Habermann, a merchant was the landlord of the original building at Wilhelmstraße 8 in 1864. The Habermans owned the house until 1895, when Władysław Piórek became the new landlord. Władysław Piórek (1852–1926) was a physician, national and social activist in the city, he supported Polish cultural, educational and charitable institutions. He has been made Honorary citizen of Bydgoszcz (Polish: Honorowi obywatele Bydgoszczy) in 1926. A dedicatory plaque has been placed on the building in 2000.

The facade has lost its decor in the 1990s.

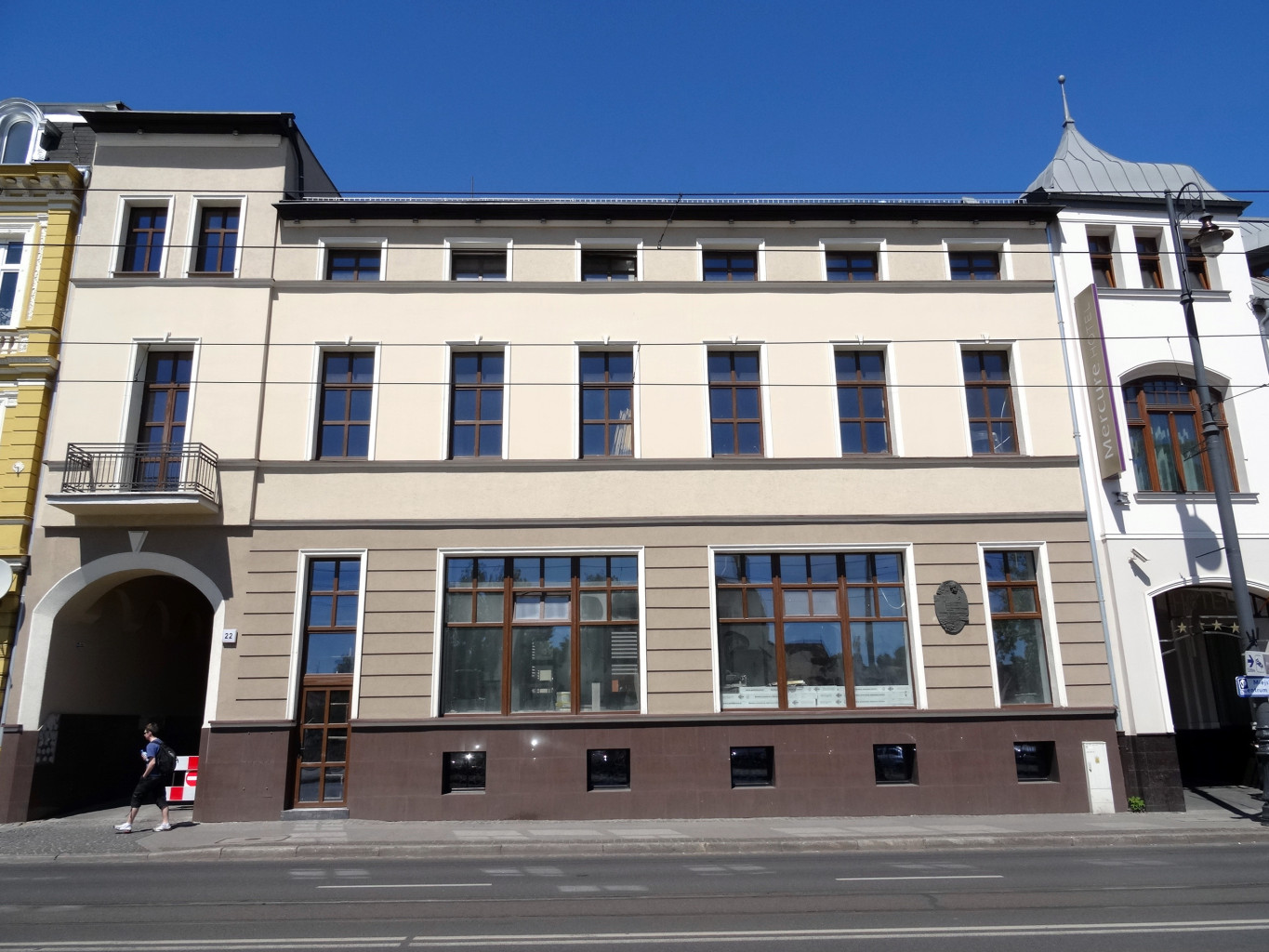
Main elevation

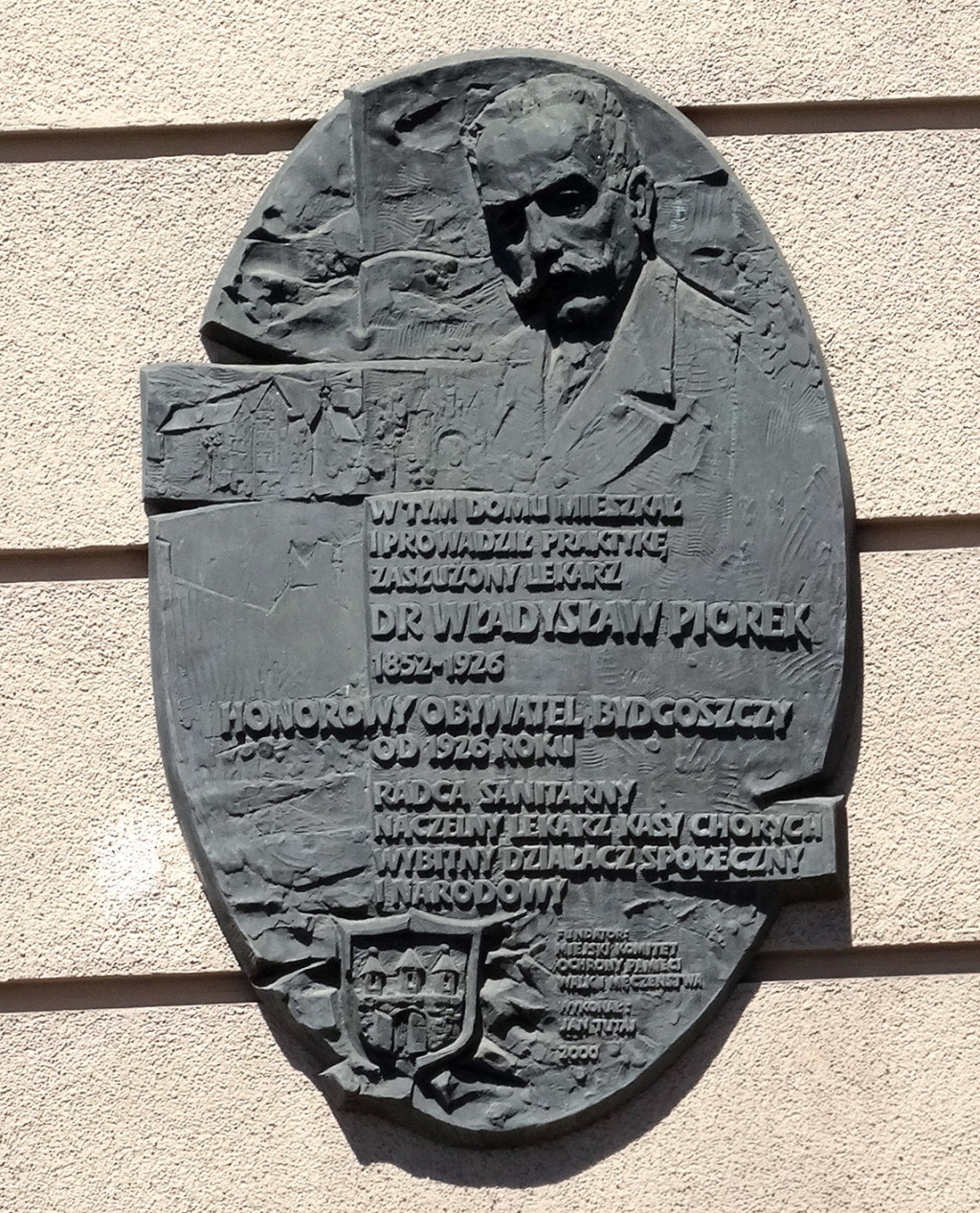
Plaque to Władysław Piórek

=== House at 20 Czartoryskiego street, corner with Focha street ===
1855–1857, by Heinrich Mautz

Neoclassical architecture

The house at then Maußstraße 1 has been built by master carpenter Heinrich Mautz for his own use, having there a sawmill. Since 1887, the villa housed the military general commanding the Prussian 4th Division billeted in Bromberg. After 1920, the place was owned by the State Treasury of Poland, housing there the general commanding the 15th Infantry Division: in the 1930s, general Wiktor Thommée lived there. During World War II, it was the HQ of the Nazi security forces: a plaque in memoriam has been placed. After World War II, it has housed a municipal branch of the city tax office (Polish: Izba Skarbowa).

The two-storey villa has got very neo-classical features, a set of identical windows one the ground floor and a series of smaller, square openings above. The entry gate on Czartoryskiego street has particularly well adorned lintel and pilasters.

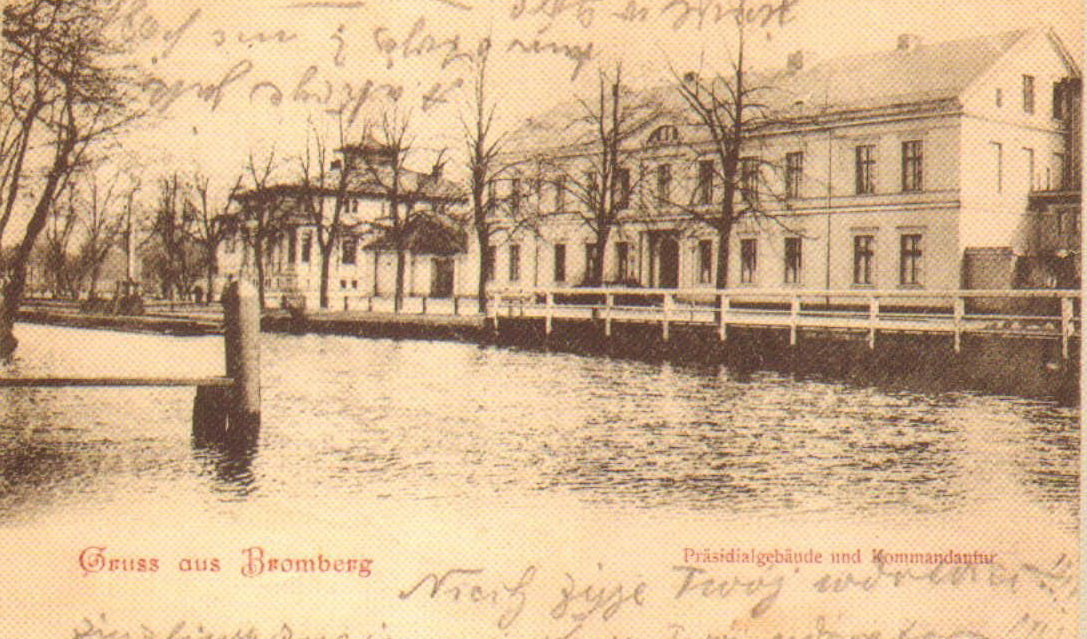
1900 view with the house on the left, 25 Focha on the right

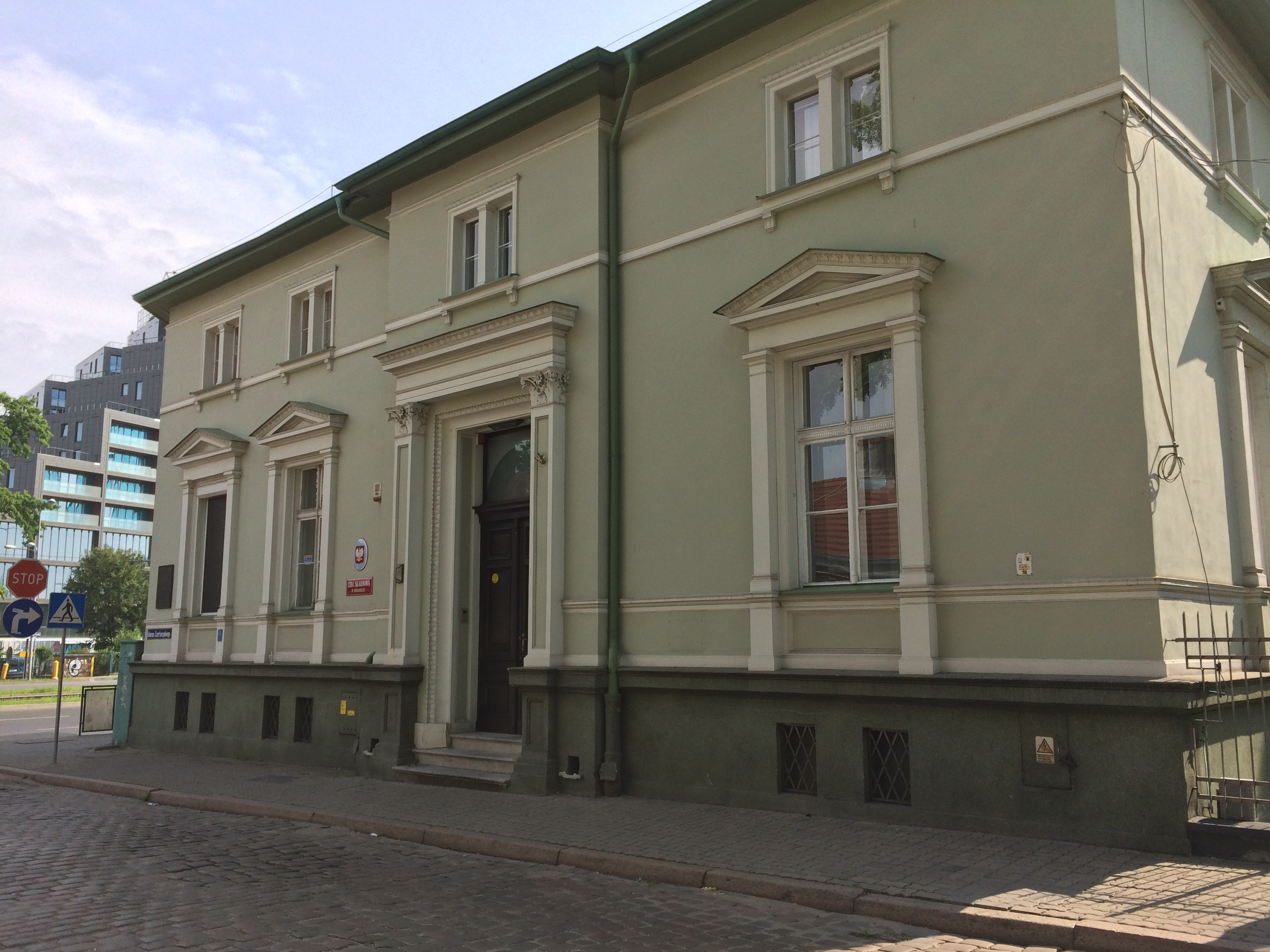
Facade on Czartoryskiego street

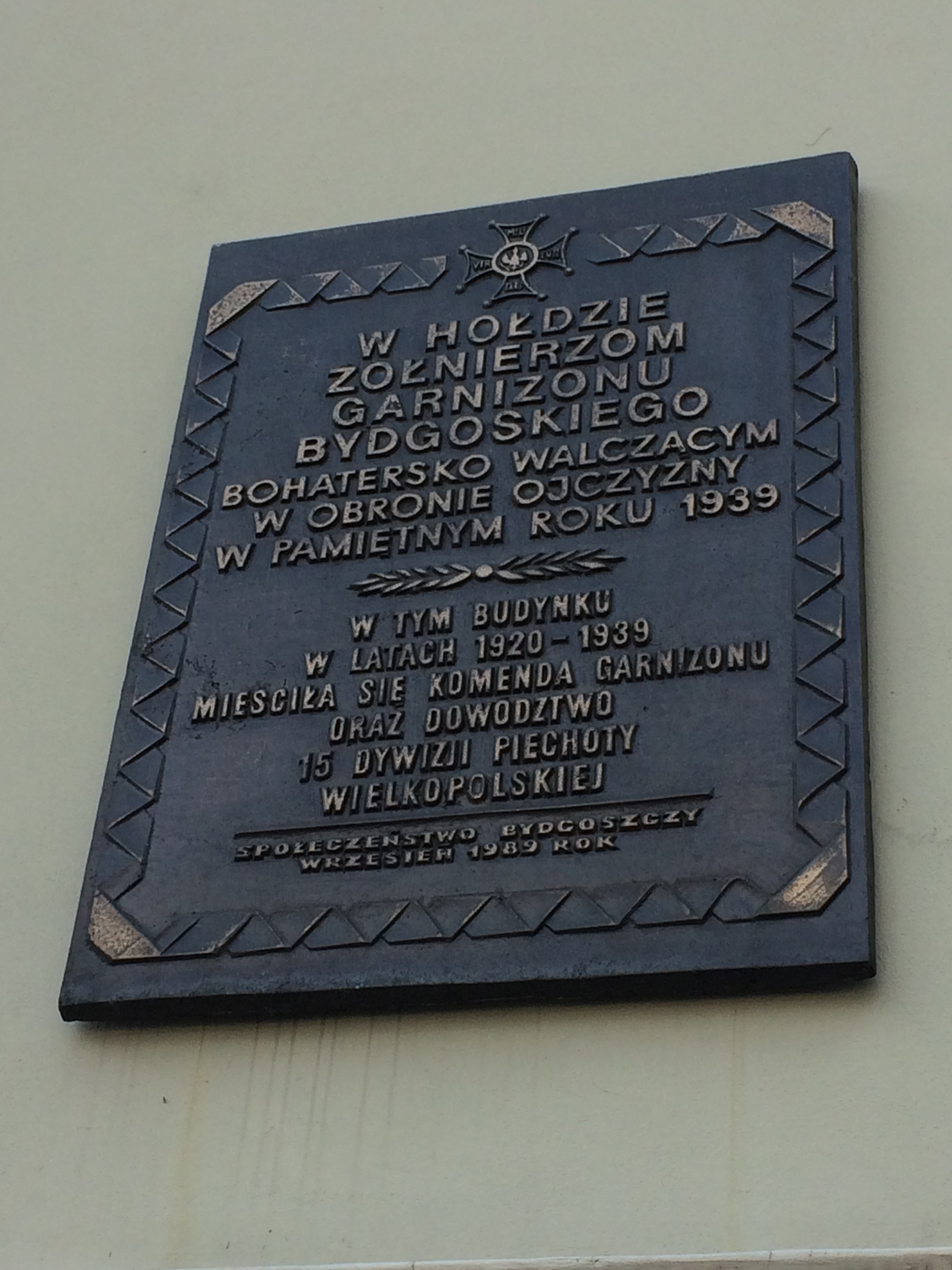
Plaque on the house

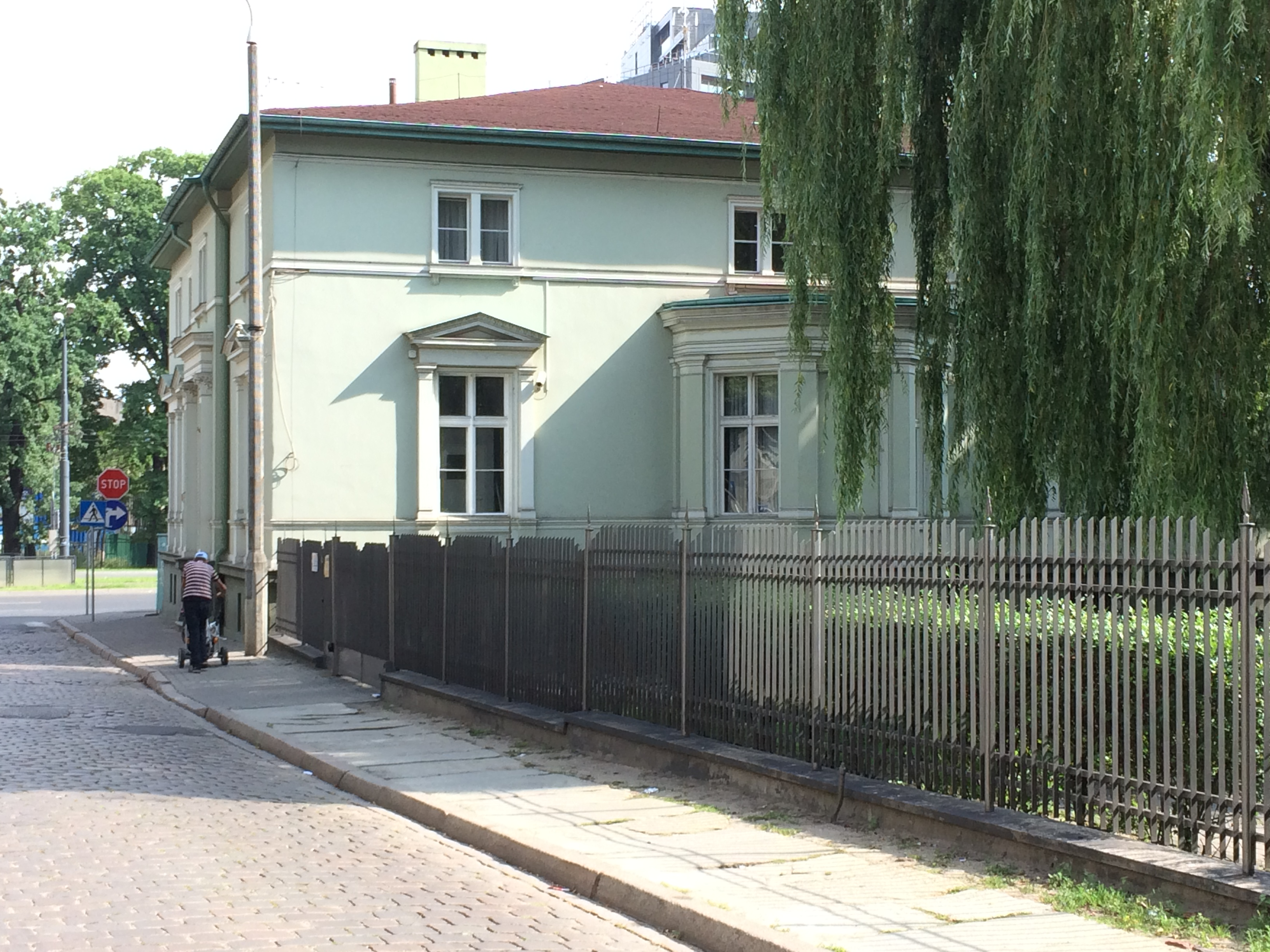
Partial view of the garden

=== Tenements at 24/26 ===
1876, by Carl Stampehl

Eclecticism & Neo-Renaissance

Johann Kretschmer, a wood merchand, was the landlord of both buildings at Wilhelmstraße 7A (24) and Wilhelmstraße 7 (26) at their completion in 1876. Carl Stampehl also designed in Bydgoszcz a Tenement at 22 Gdanska street in 1875 and the Villa Carl Blumwe in 1893.

The main elevation at 24 displays, since a recent renovation, a small frieze on the top of the ground floor window, several cartouches with griffins, windows with balusters and pilasters on the second level and a mansard roof.

The building at Nr.26, at the corner with Warmińskiego street, has been recently refurbished. It displays more modest features.

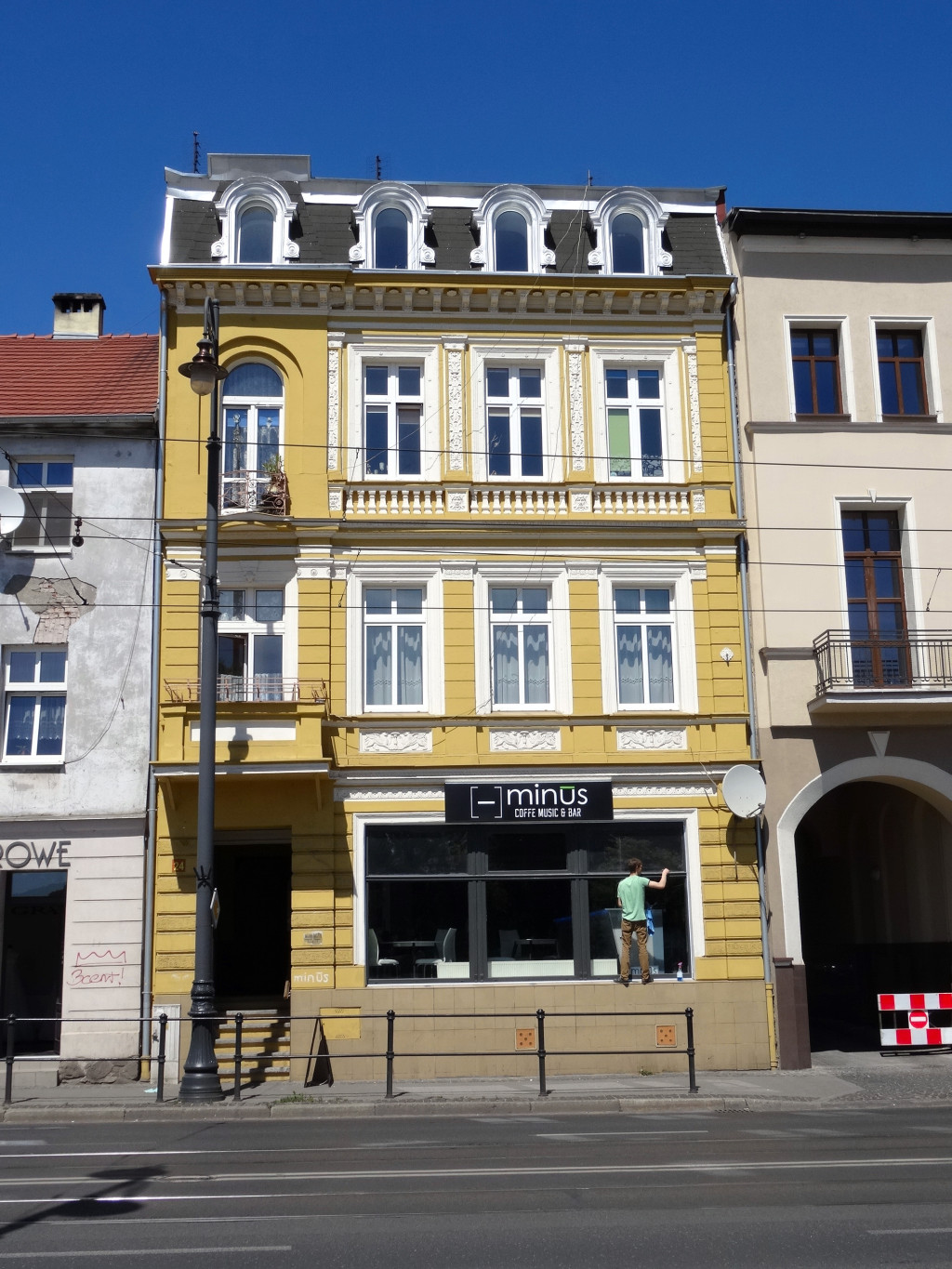
Main elevation (Nr.24)

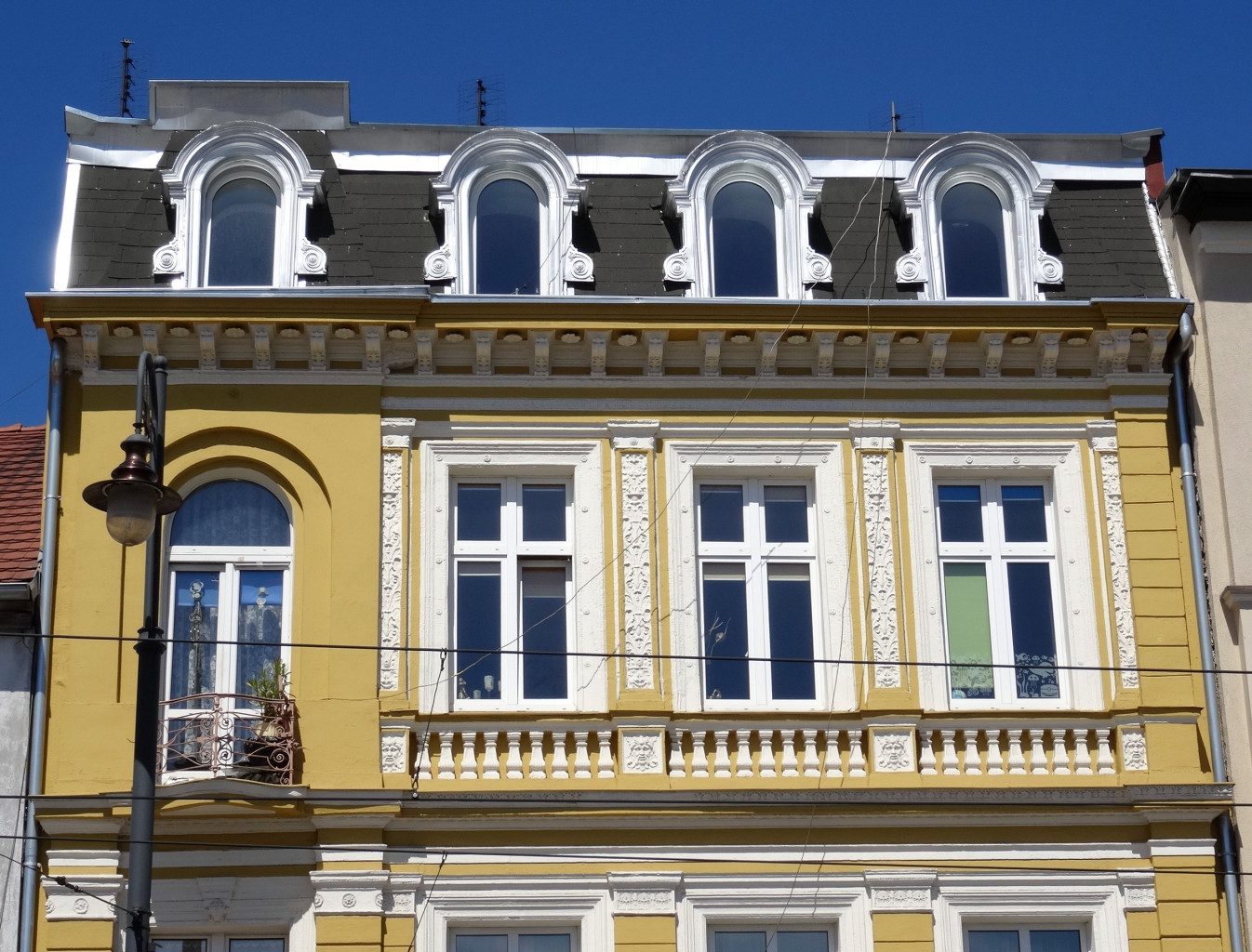
Detail of the upper floor decoration (Nr.24)

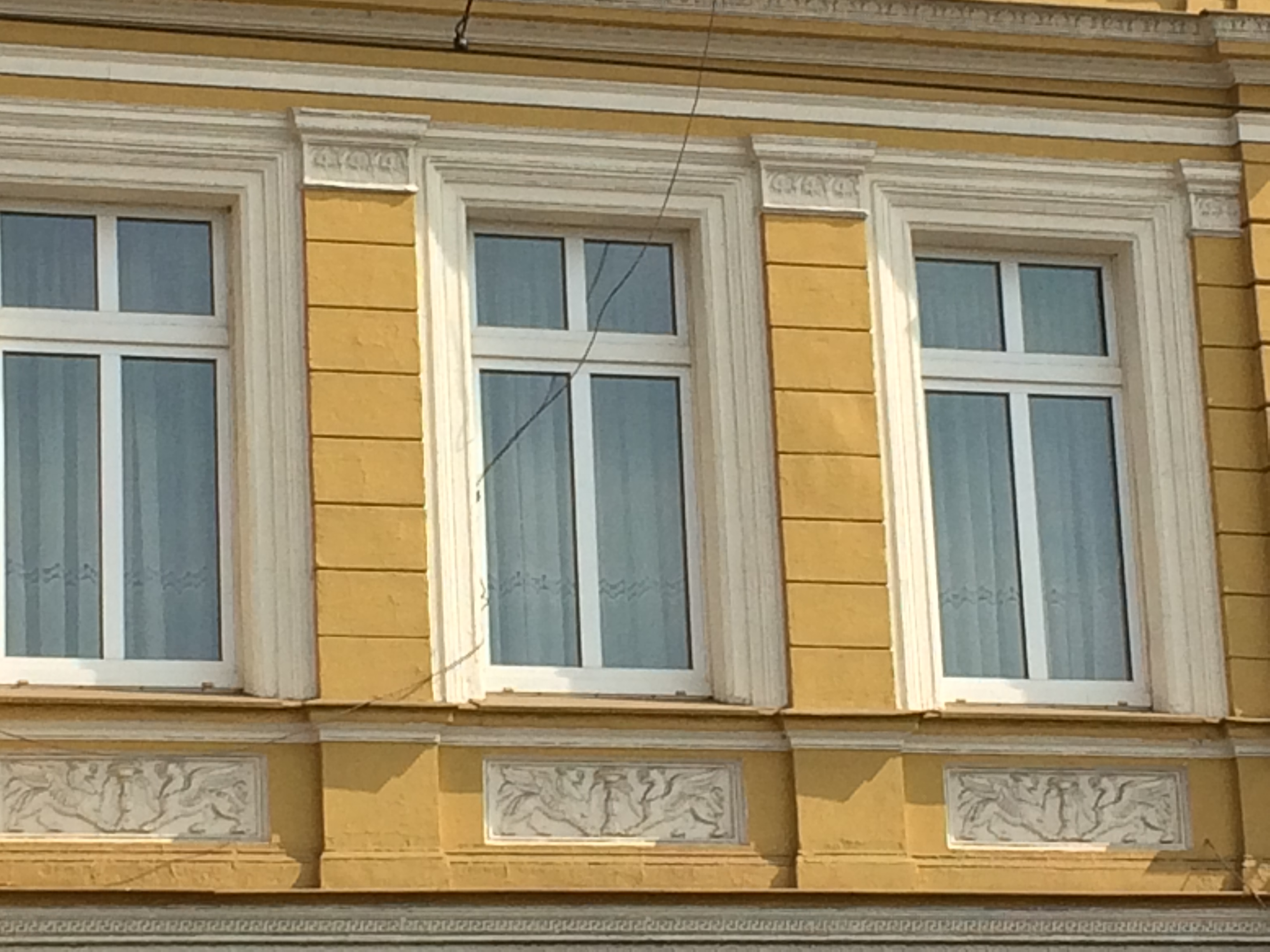
Detail of windows adornment (Nr.24)

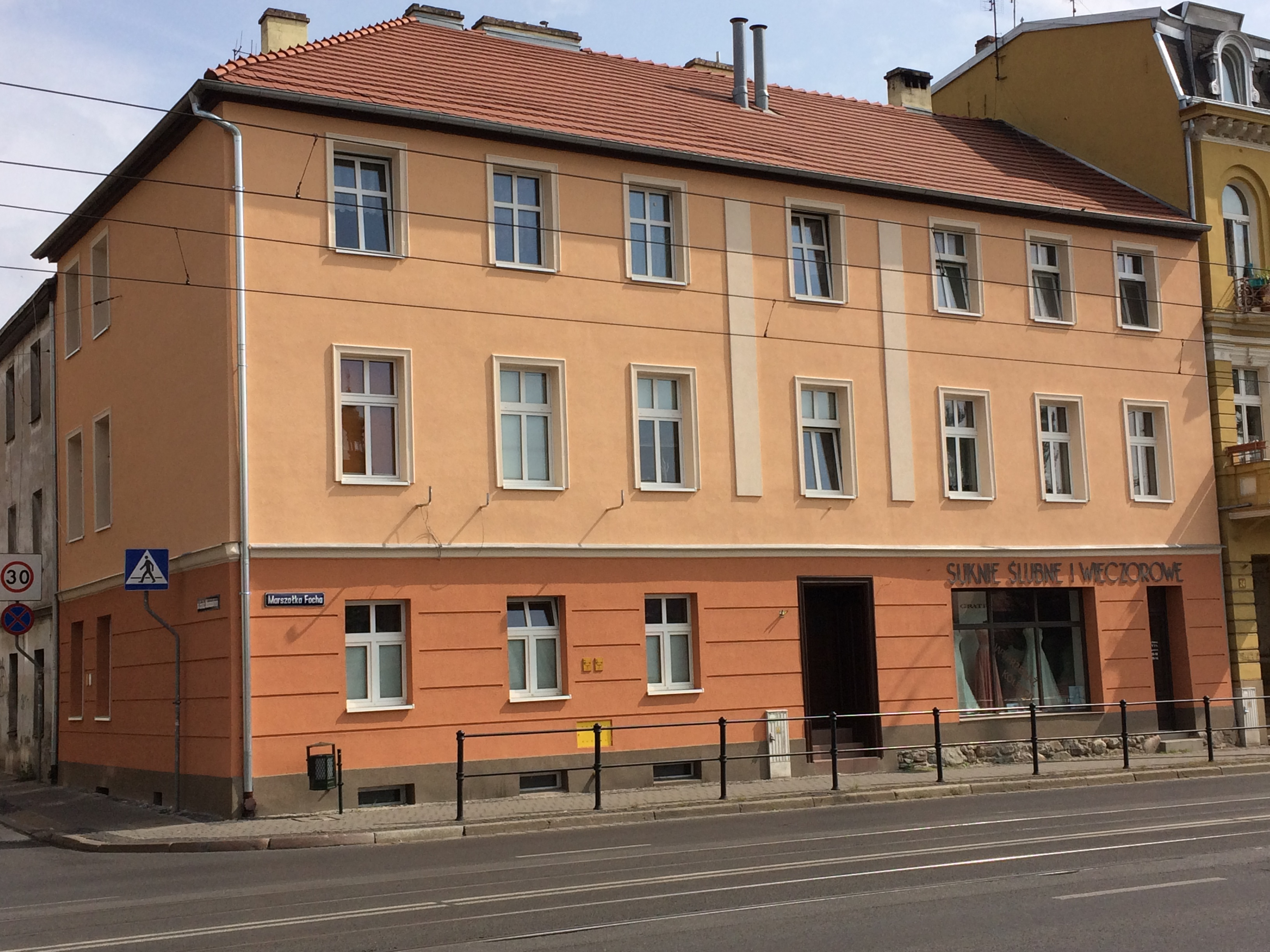
Tenement at Nr.26

=== House at 25 ===
1799

Neoclassical architecture

The villa has been, from 1836 to 1920, the official residence of the presidents of the Bydgoszcz Regency (German: Regierungsbezirk,Polish: Rejencja), as the northern of two Prussian administrative regions of the Grand Duchy of Posen (1815–49) and the Province of Posen (1849–1918). The president executive office was located in today's Regional Office Building. The first president to occupy the site was Carl von Wissmann. In front of the house ran the Old Bydgoszcz Canal till 1973: opposite the villa was located one of the lock (Polish: Śluza II "Grottgera") at the level of Artur Grottger street. During the evacuation of the city by Prussians in summer 1919, furniture and equipment of the palace was spirited away.

The vast edifice has only one storey. Its elevation on Focha street displays a perfect symmetry with two annexes with vehicle gate on both side. The main entry features typical neo-classical elements: the gate is flanked by two columns, topped by a large lintel. The ensemble is part of an avant-corps crowned by a temple-like triangular pediment.

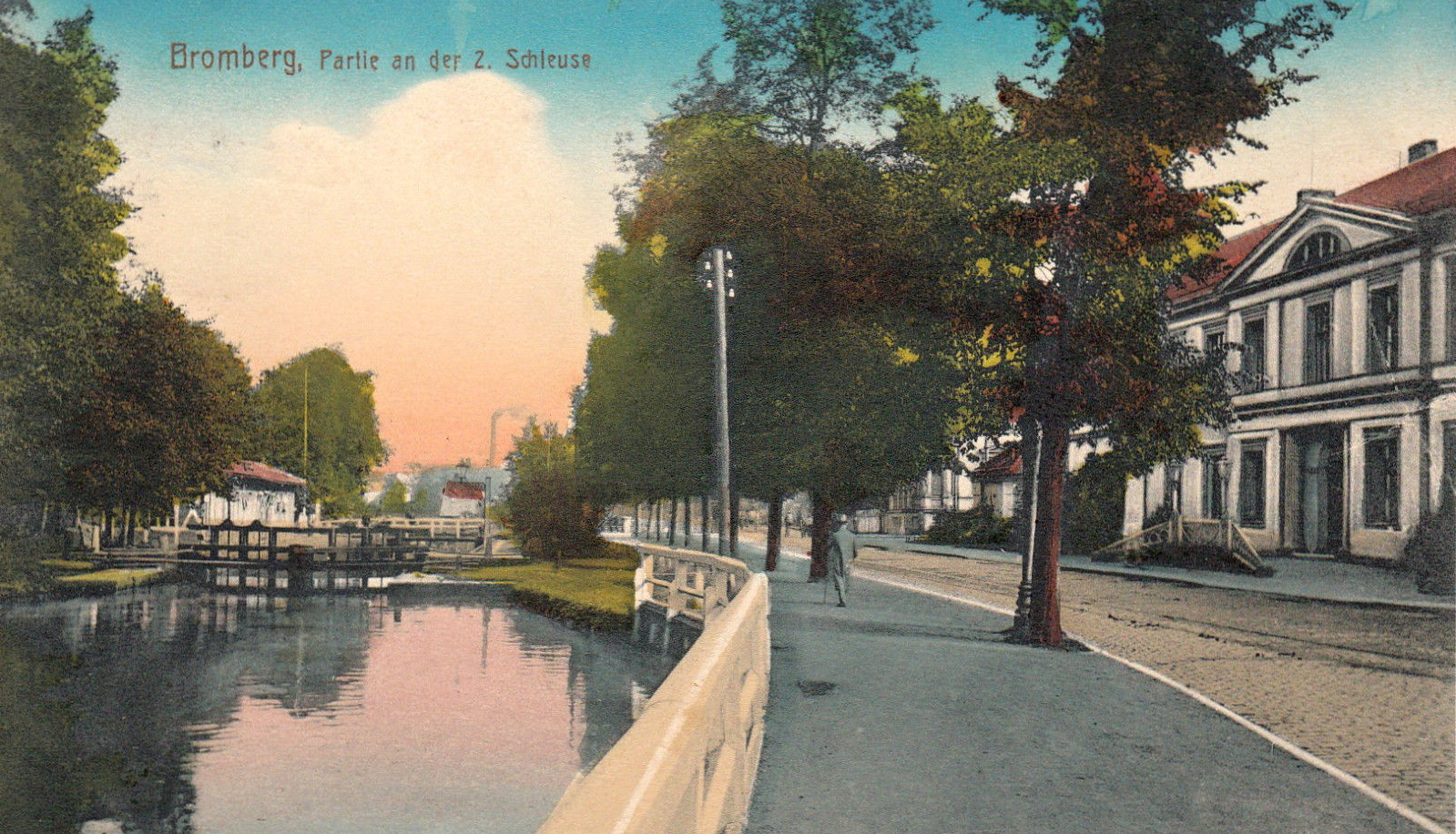
Villa at Nr.25 in 1914, in front of the Old canal lock

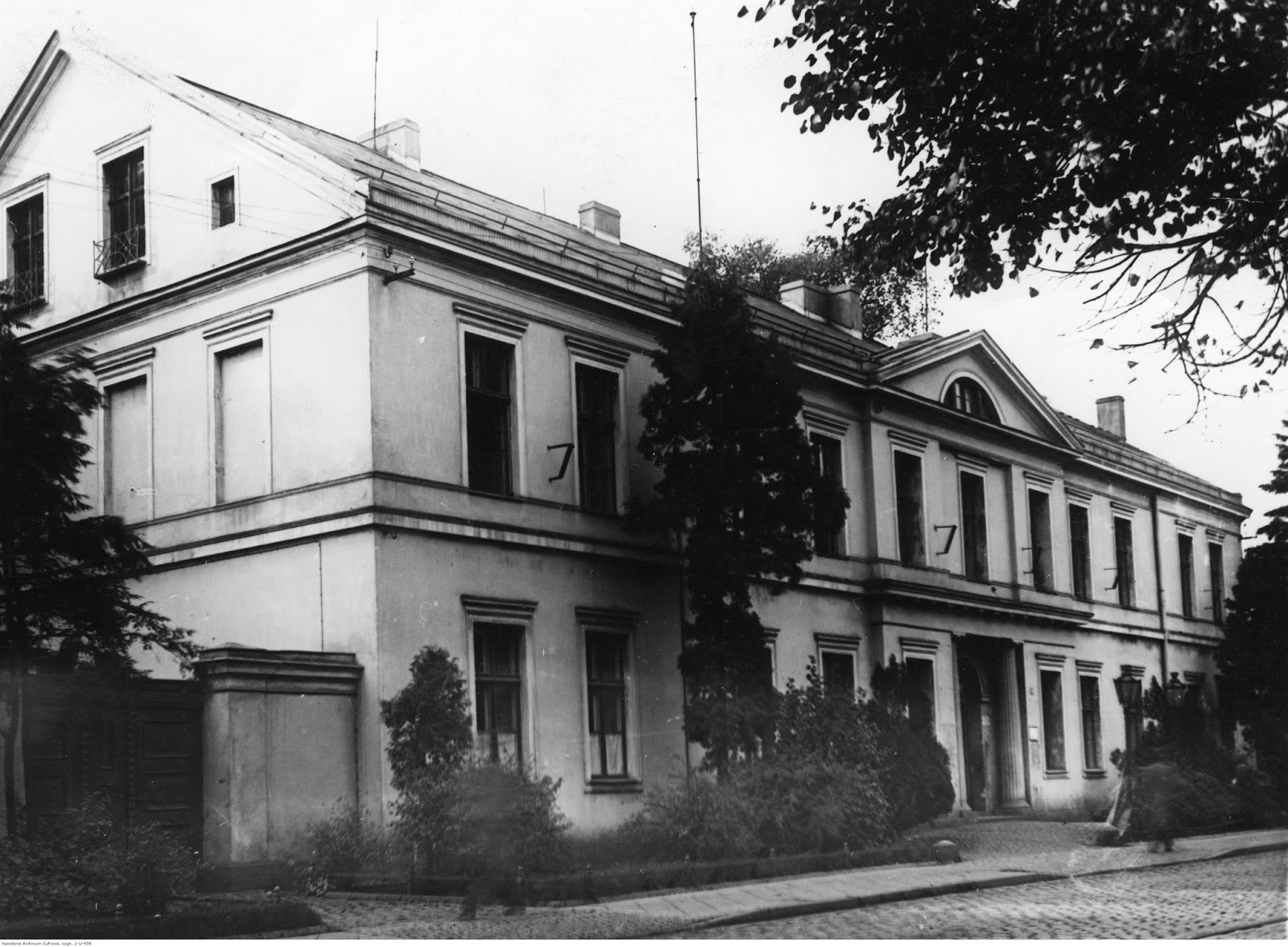
Picture of Regency building ca 1900s

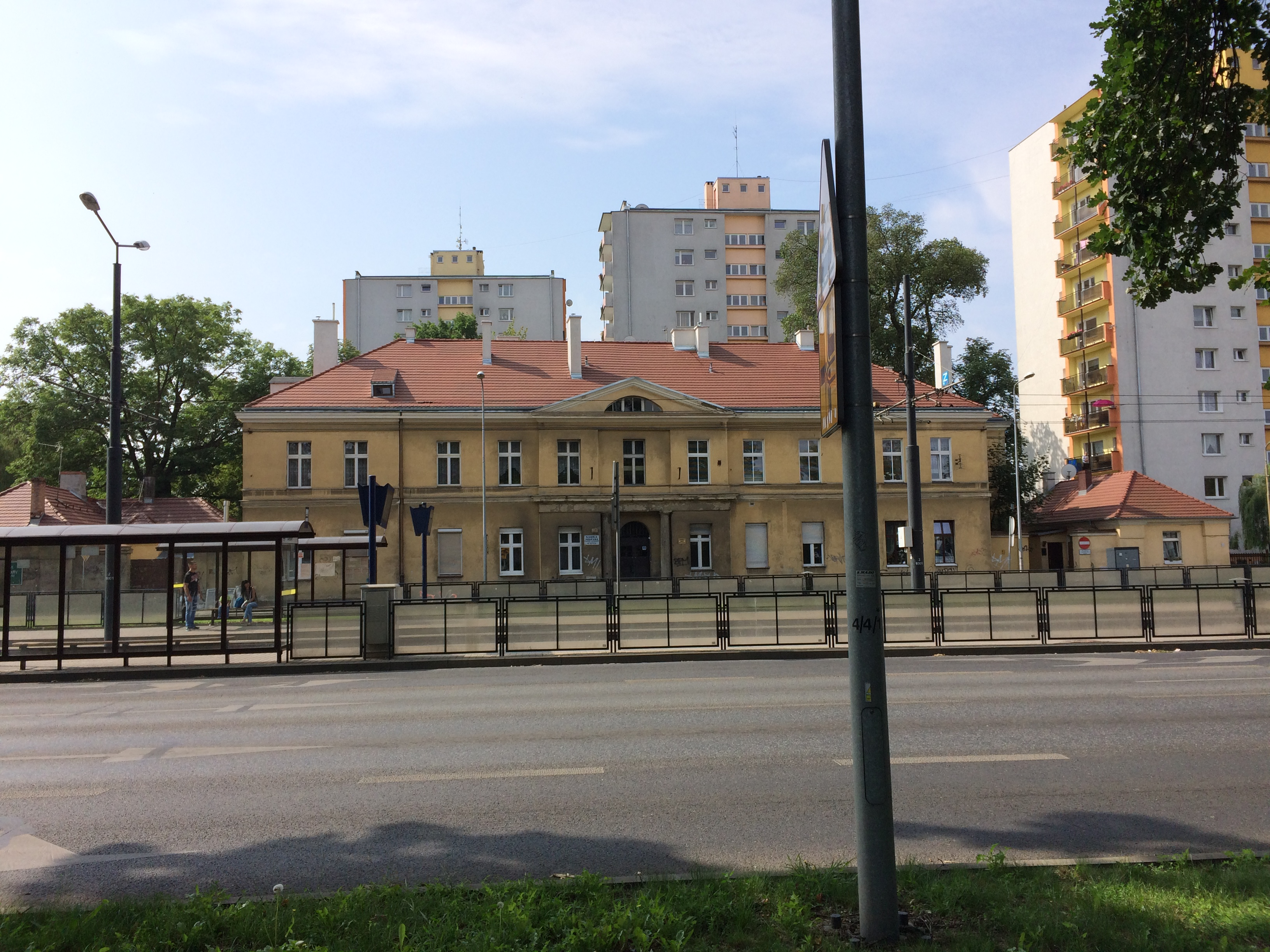
General view

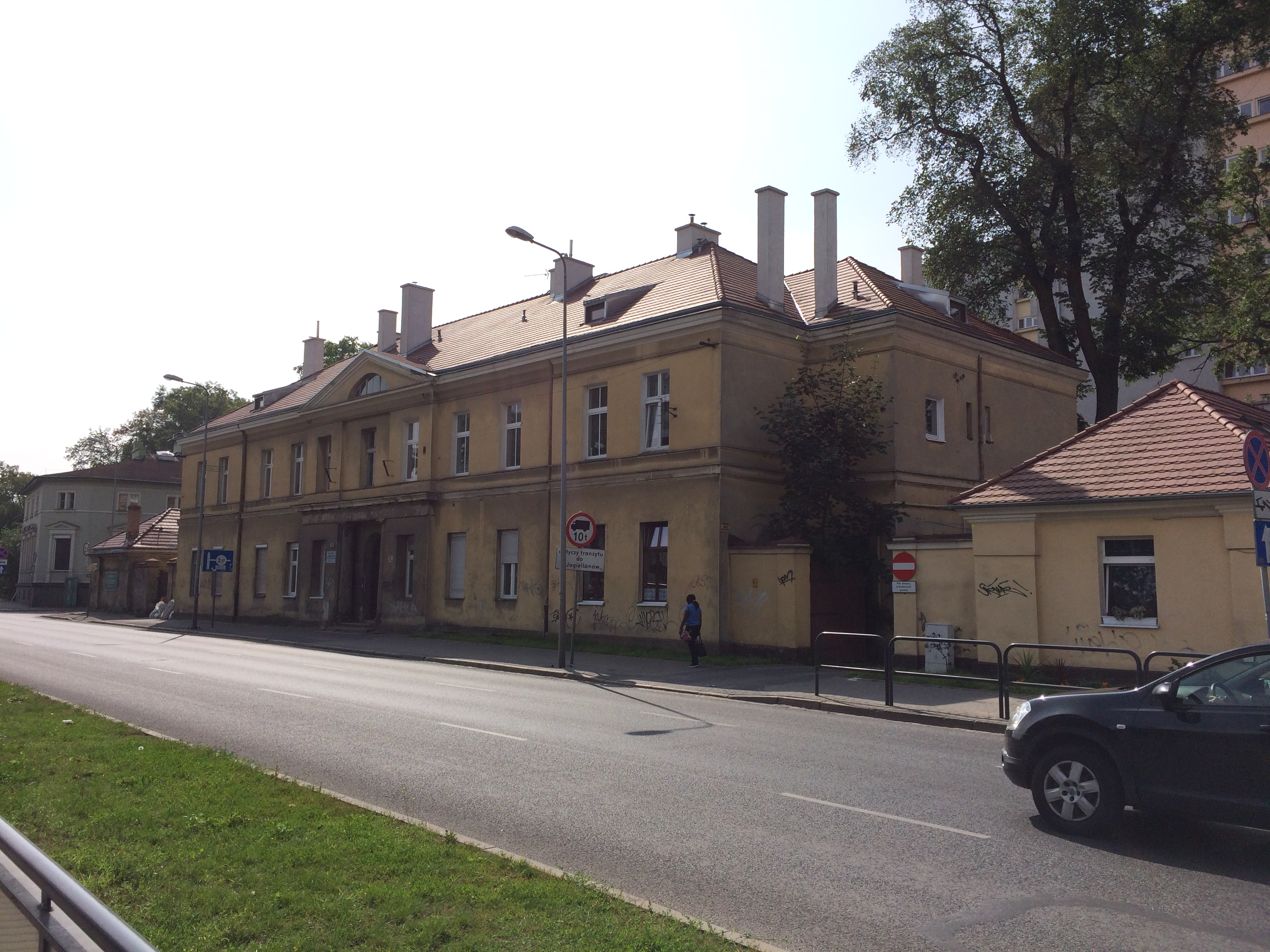
View from the street

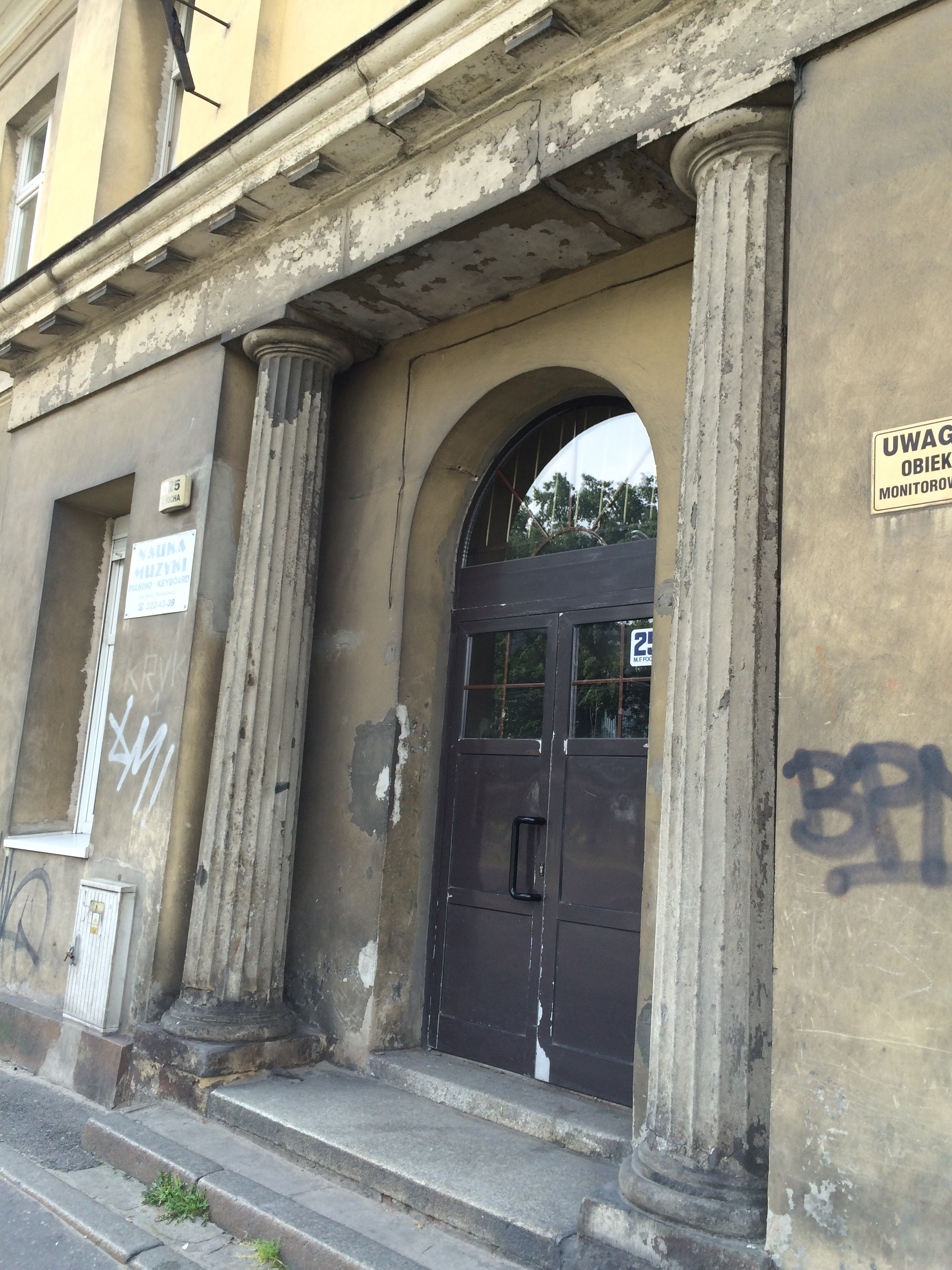
Main gate

=== Tenement at 28, corner with 1 Warmińskiego street ===
1896-1897

Eclecticism with Art Nouveau elements

The commissioner and first landlord was Hugo Rossow, a restaurateur running a pub house (German: Gesellschaftshaus). The building has been referenced for a long time at 6 Wilhelm straße.

Thoroughly refurbished in 2020, after being in a poor state for many years, the building boasts, among others, bas-reliefs, cornices, bossage elements on the ground floor and a portal with pillar strips topped by a balustrade line. One can notice two hooks on rosettes (one on the corner, one on Warmińskiego elevation) still preserved: they were used to support a traction network that carried coal to feed the former power plant located in the street (at now Nr.8) at the turn of the 20th century.

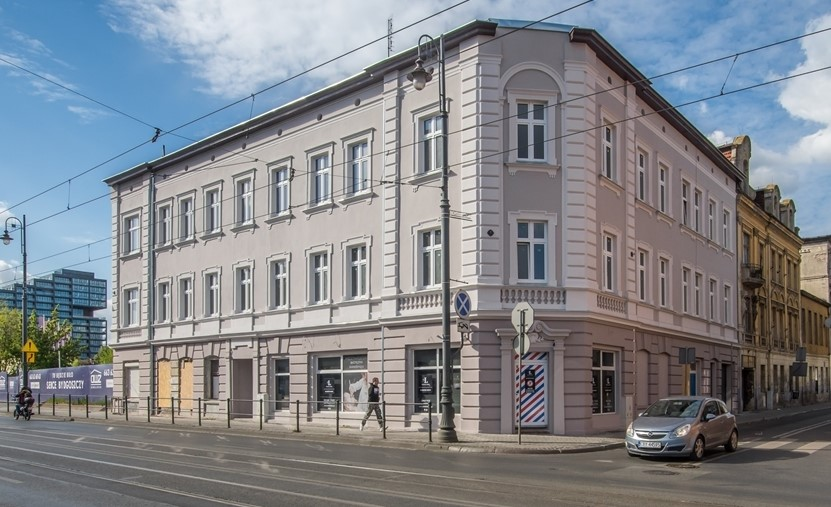
View of the tenement from Focha street

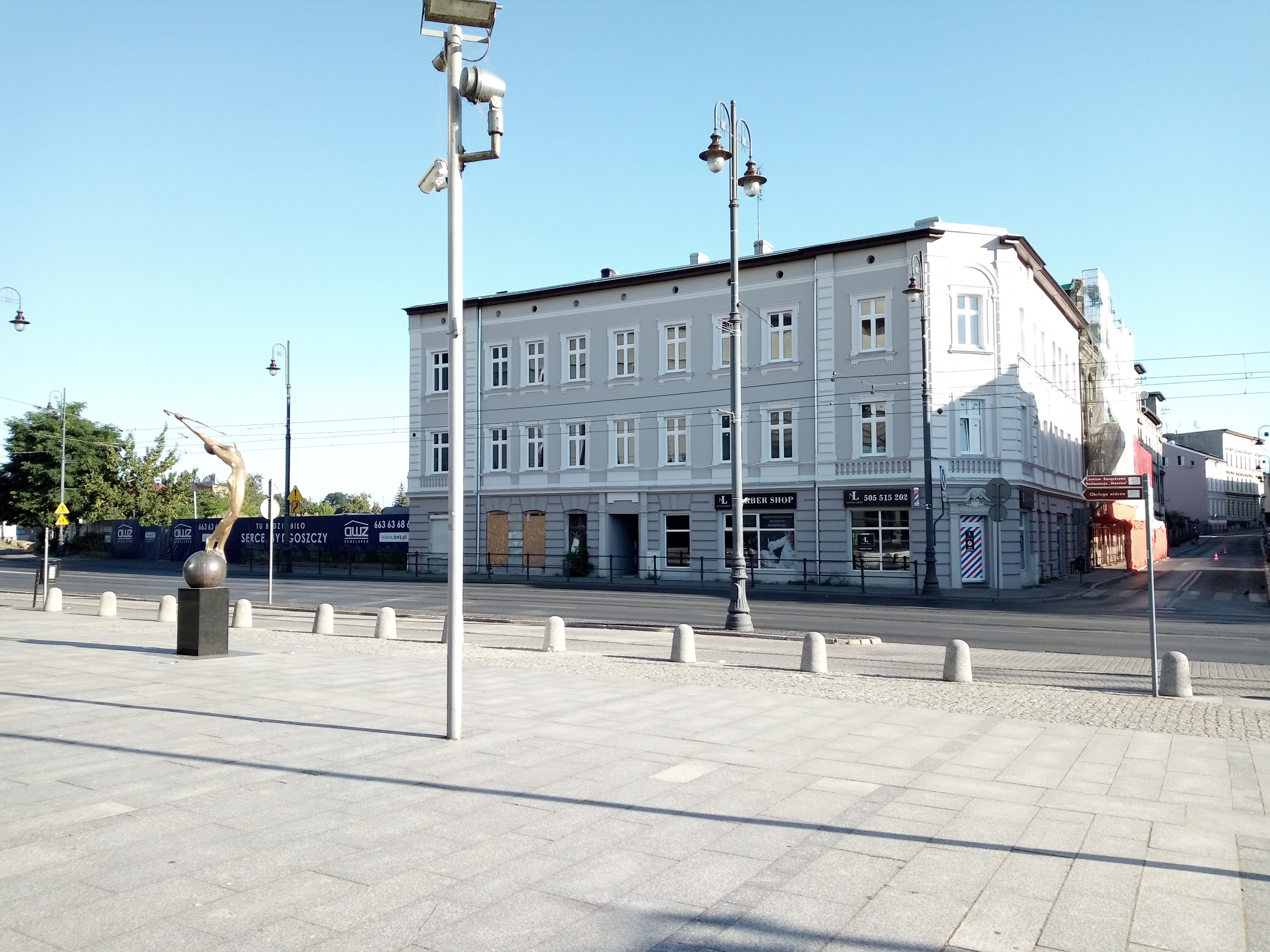
Elevation at Nr.28-view from the opera

=== Multi Kino, at 48 ===
2002

International Style

The plot where stands the cinema complex has been for a long time part of the Old Canal of Bydgoszcz banks, before its burying in 1973. During the Prussian era, a monument to Franz von Brenkenhoff (1723–1780), Prussian engineer who built the Bydgoszcz Canal, was standing there. It was a metal bust on a pedestal, unveiled on October 27, 1894, and located between two canal locks (Nr.II-"Grottgera" and III-"Grunwaldzka"), in the area of today's Artur Grottger street. In July 1919, it was evacuated, along with the equipment of Regency Building at Nr.25 to the city of Piła.

Multikino multiplex was the first of its kind built in Bydgoszcz. It houses 10 screens for a total capacity of 2,175 seats.

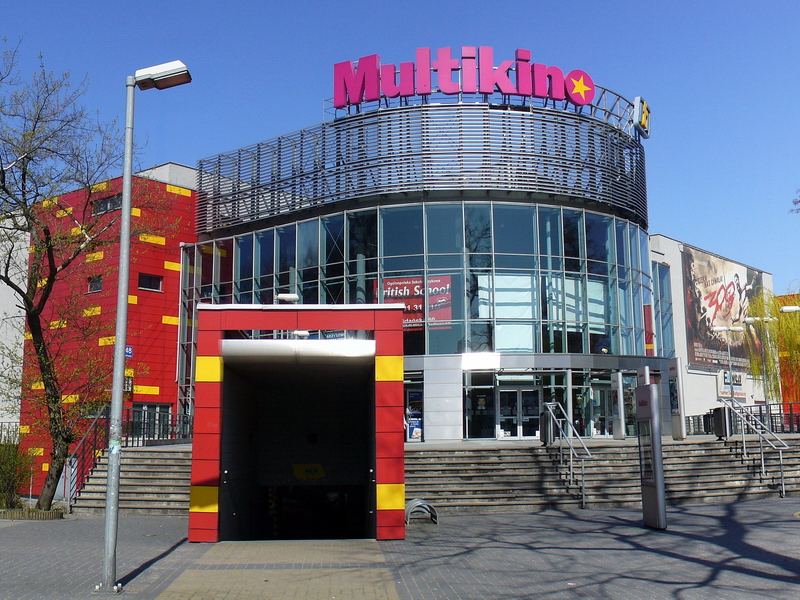
View from Focha Street

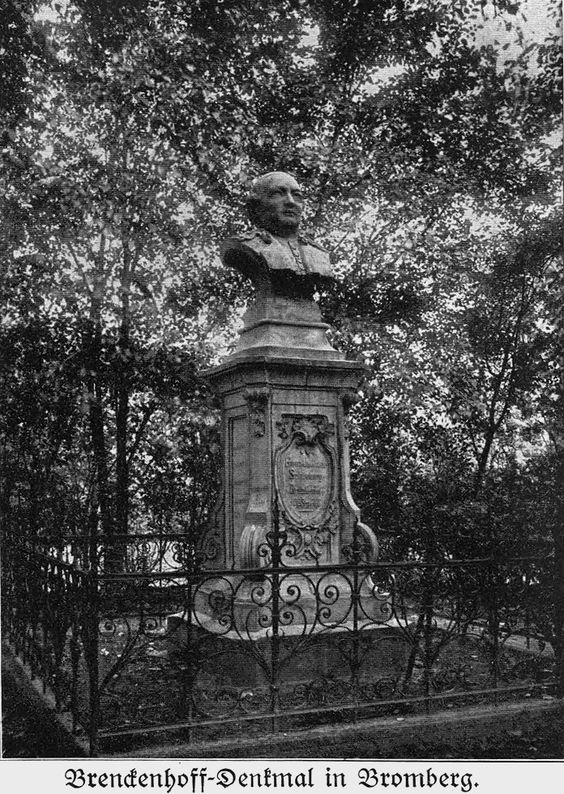
Monument to Von Brenkenhoff, 1914 Bromberg

=== Mechanical School Nr.1, Corner with 37 Świętej Trójcy street ===
Registered on Kuyavian-Pomeranian Voivodeship heritage list, Nr.601424, Reg. A/890, March 23, 1993

1911, by Otto Brech & Carl Meyer

Neo-Baroque & Eclecticism

The building of the Mechanical School Nr.1 in Bydgoszcz is a historic public building in Bydgoszcz, serving educational purposes. It has been christened in 1989, Mechanical School Franciszek Sylwester Jerzy Siemiradzki, an engineer and director of the school from 1923 to 1939.

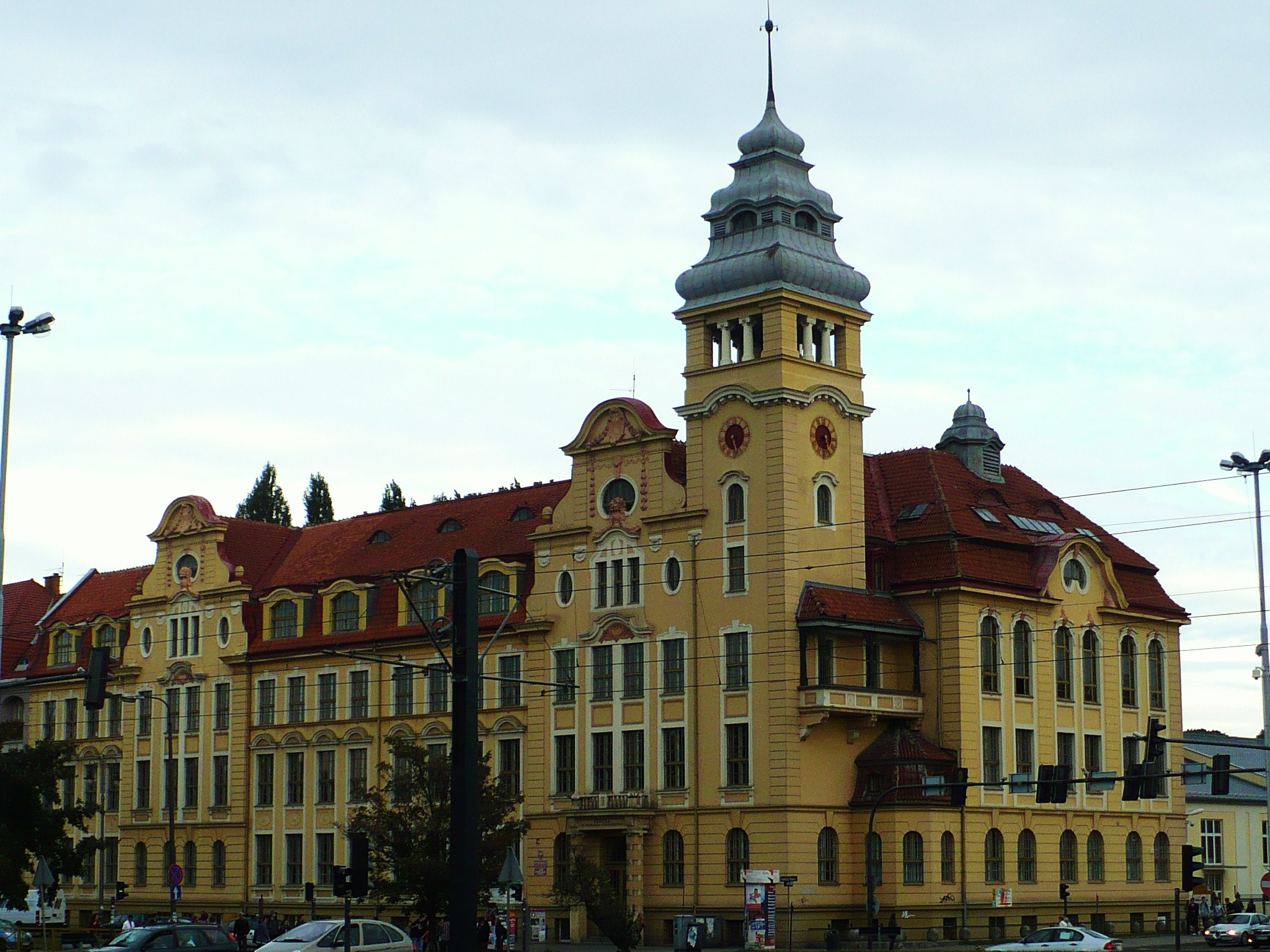
View from Nakielska street

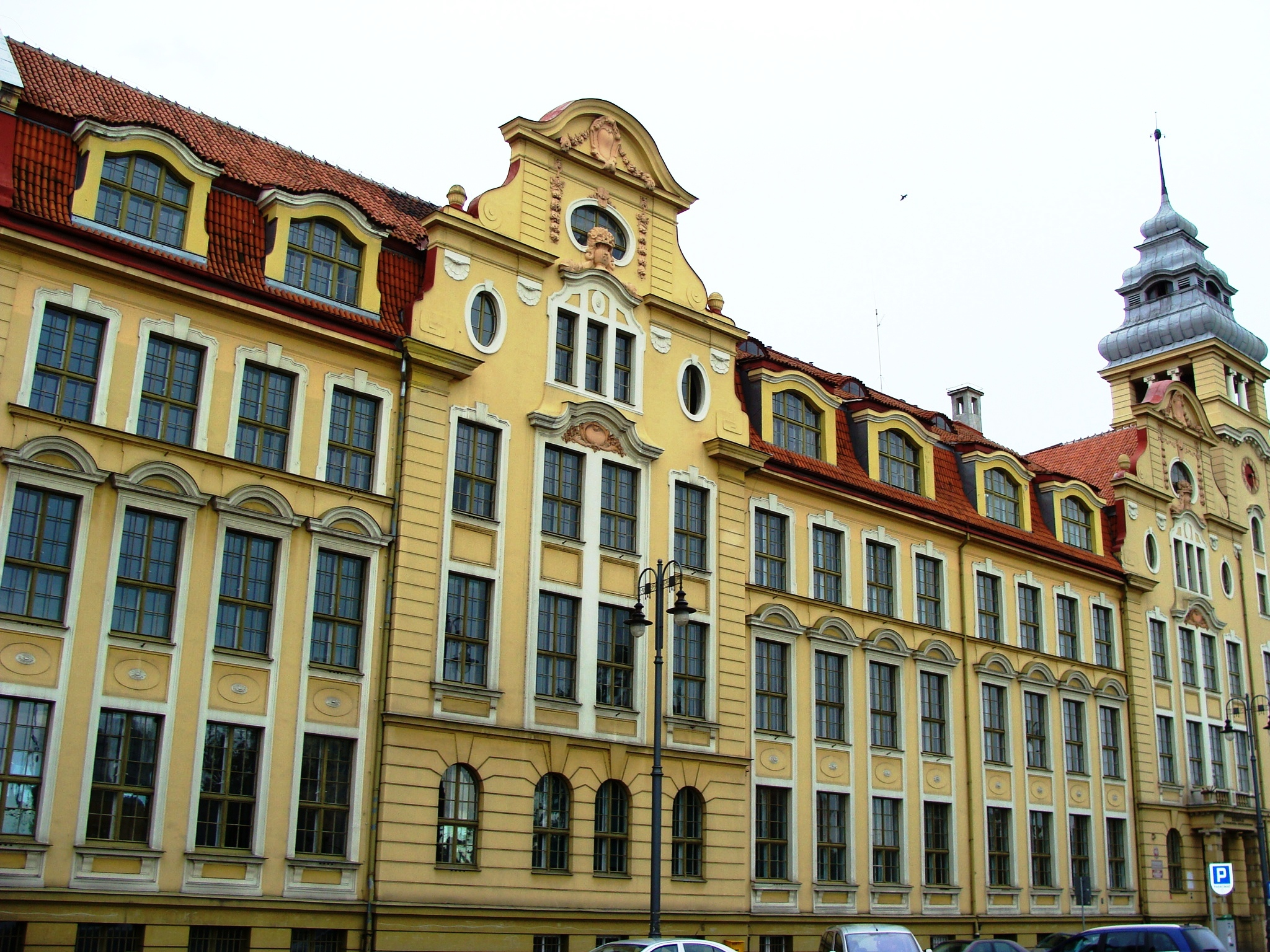
View from Focha Street

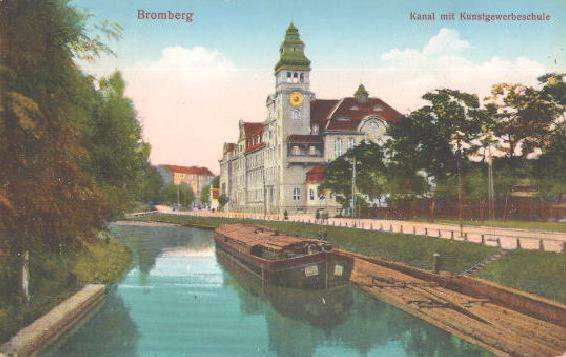
Old Canal with Mechanical school on a 1914 postcard
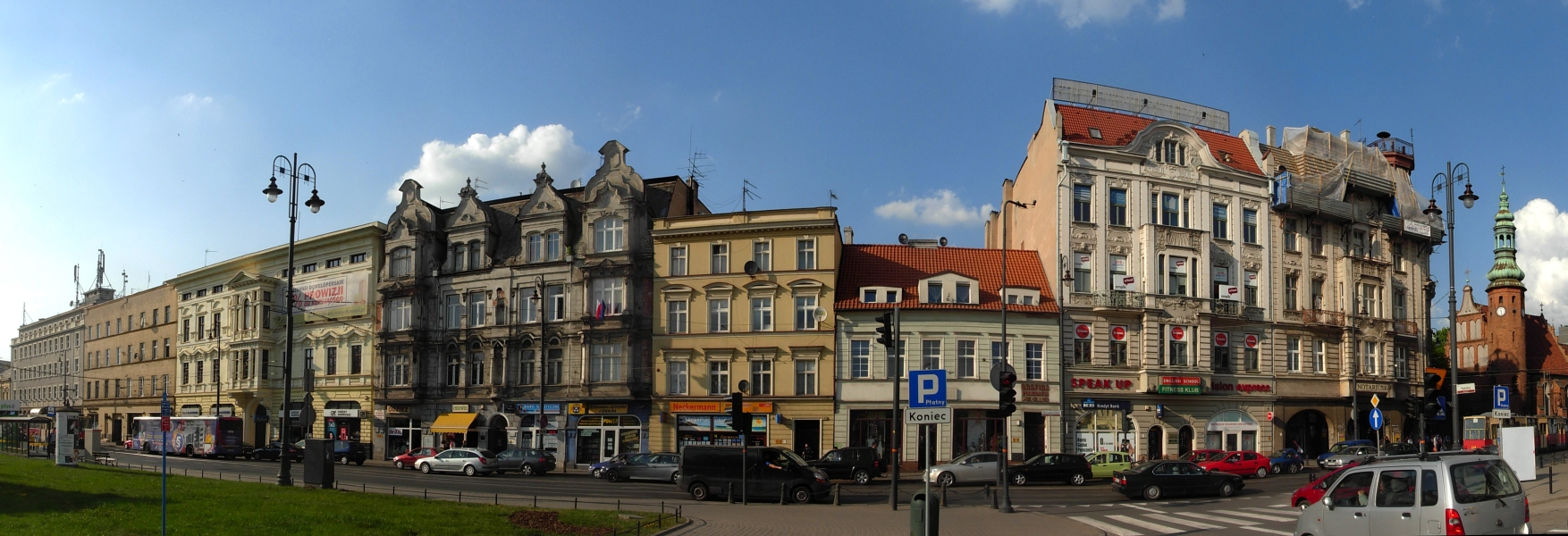
Panorama of Focha street buildings from Nr.2 (far right) to Nr.16 (far left)

== See also ==
- Bydgoszcz
- Bydgoszcz Architects (1850-1970s)

== Bibliography ==
- (in Polish) Derenda, Jerzy (2006). Piękna stara Bydgoszcz – tom I z serii Bydgoszcz miasto na Kujawach. Bydgoszcz: Towarzystwo Miłośników Miasta Bydgoszczy.
- (in Polish) Umiński, Janusz (1996). Bydgoszcz. Przewodnik. Bydgoszcz: Regionalny Oddział PTTK „Szlak Brdy”.
- (in Polish) Bręczewska-Kulesza, Daria. Przegląd stylów występujących w bydgoskiej architekturze drugiej połowy XIX i początku XX stulecia. Bydgoszcz.
- (in Polish) Bydgoszcz w stronę Okola. Bydgoszcz: Zespół Pracowni Dokumentacji i Popularyzacji Zabytków Wojewódzkiego Ośrodka Kultury w Bydgoszczy. 2004. ISBN 8392172507.
- (in Polish) Jastrzębska-Puzowska, Iwona (2005). Od miasteczka do metropolii. Rozwój architektoniczny i urbanistyczny Bydgoszczy w latach 1850-1920. Toruń: Wydawnictwo MADO. ISBN 9788389886385.
- (in Polish) Błażejewski Stanisław, Kutta Janusz, Romaniuk Marek (1994). Bydgoski Słownik Biograficzny. Tom I. Kujawsko-Pomorskie Towarzystwo Kulturalne Wojewódzki Ośrodek Kultury.
