= Theatre Square, Bydgoszcz =

Square in Bydgoszcz, Poland

Coordinates: 53°07′26″N 18°00′06″E

Theatre square in Bydgoszcz
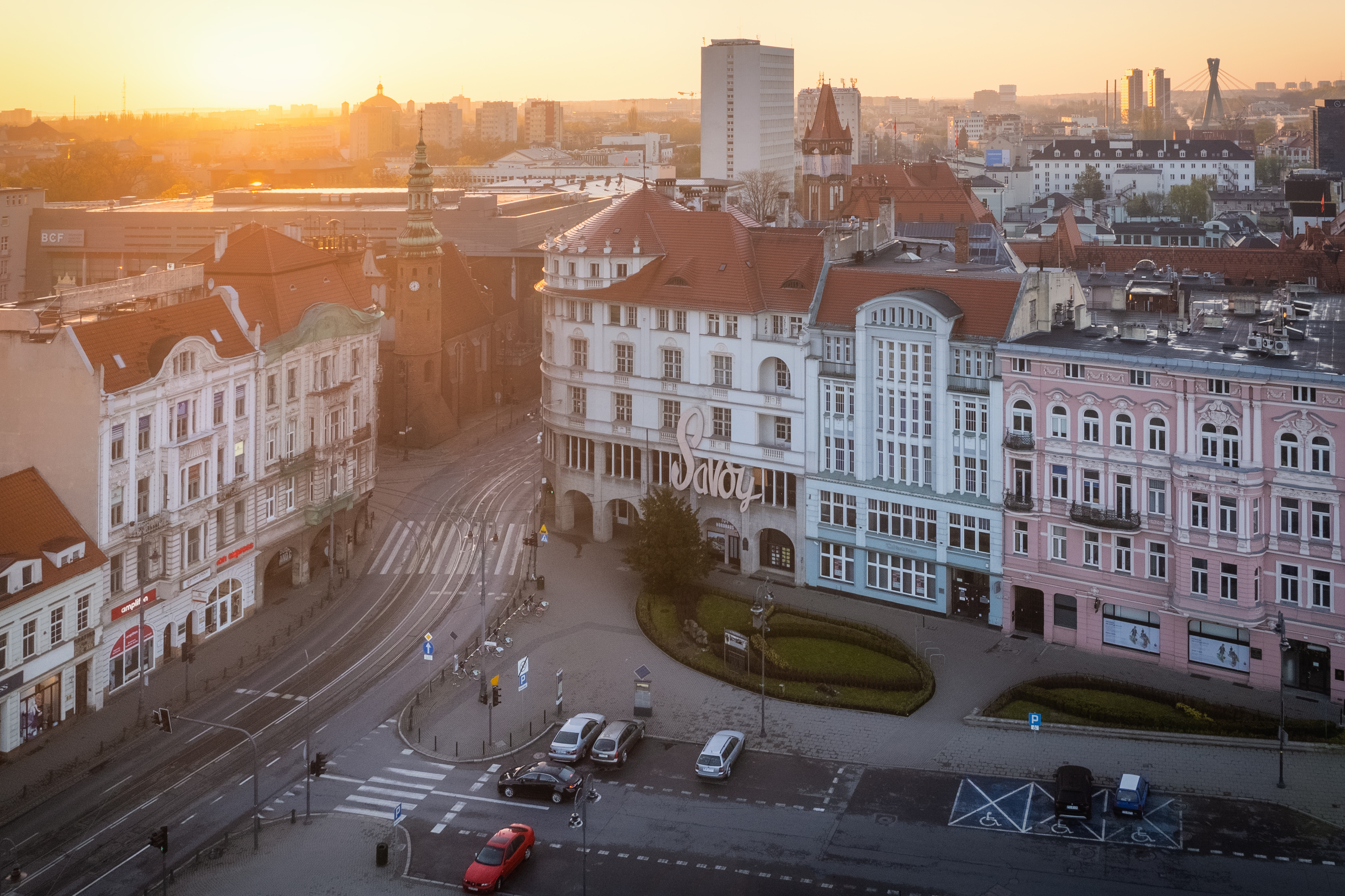
- View from Brda river

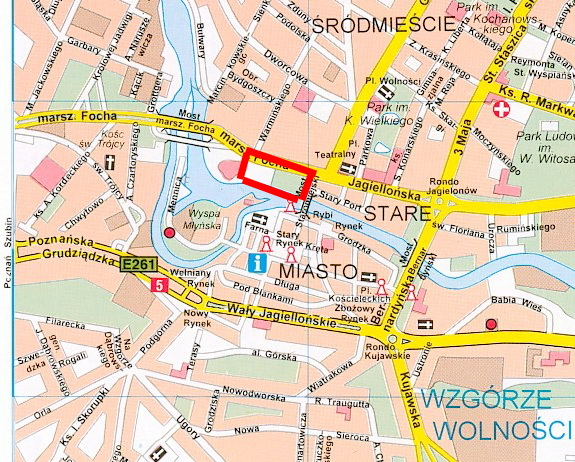
- Location in Bydgoszcz
- Native name: Plac Teatralny w Bydgoszczy (Polish)
- Type: Square
- Owner: City of Bydgoszcz
- Location: Bydgoszcz, Poland

Theatre Square is a large and historical place in downtown Bydgoszcz. On its borders stand many buildings registered on the Kuyavian-Pomeranian Voivodeship Heritage List.

== Location ==
Theatre Square is located in the heart of Bydgoszcz: it is delimitated by the following streets:

- Karmelicka, to the West;
- Ferdinand Foch to the North;
- Mostowa to the East;
- Brda river to the South.

It is situated on the northern edge of Bydgoszcz Old Town, and acts as linkage with Bydgoszcz Downtown district, located to north of the river. On the eastern frontage of the square are located urban houses built between the late 19th centuries and the beginning of the 20th century.

== History ==
The first buildings in the area of the current Theatre Square appeared at the end of the 14th century. They were St. Mary's Church of the Carmelites and the associated monastic buildings.

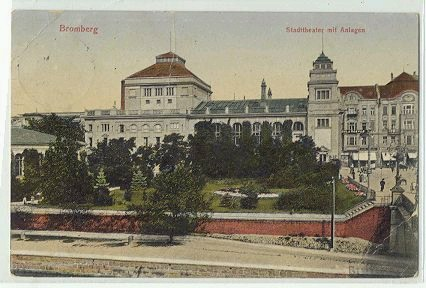
Bydgoszcz Theatre ca 1900

In the middle of the 16th century, both the monastery and church were rebuilt using bricks, and the convent was surrounded by a wall (part of the city's defense system). The road leading to the Baltic harbour of Gdansk was controlled by the now gone "Gate of Dantzig" (north of the actual square). Secularization ordered in 1816 by Prussian authorities reshuffled this layout.

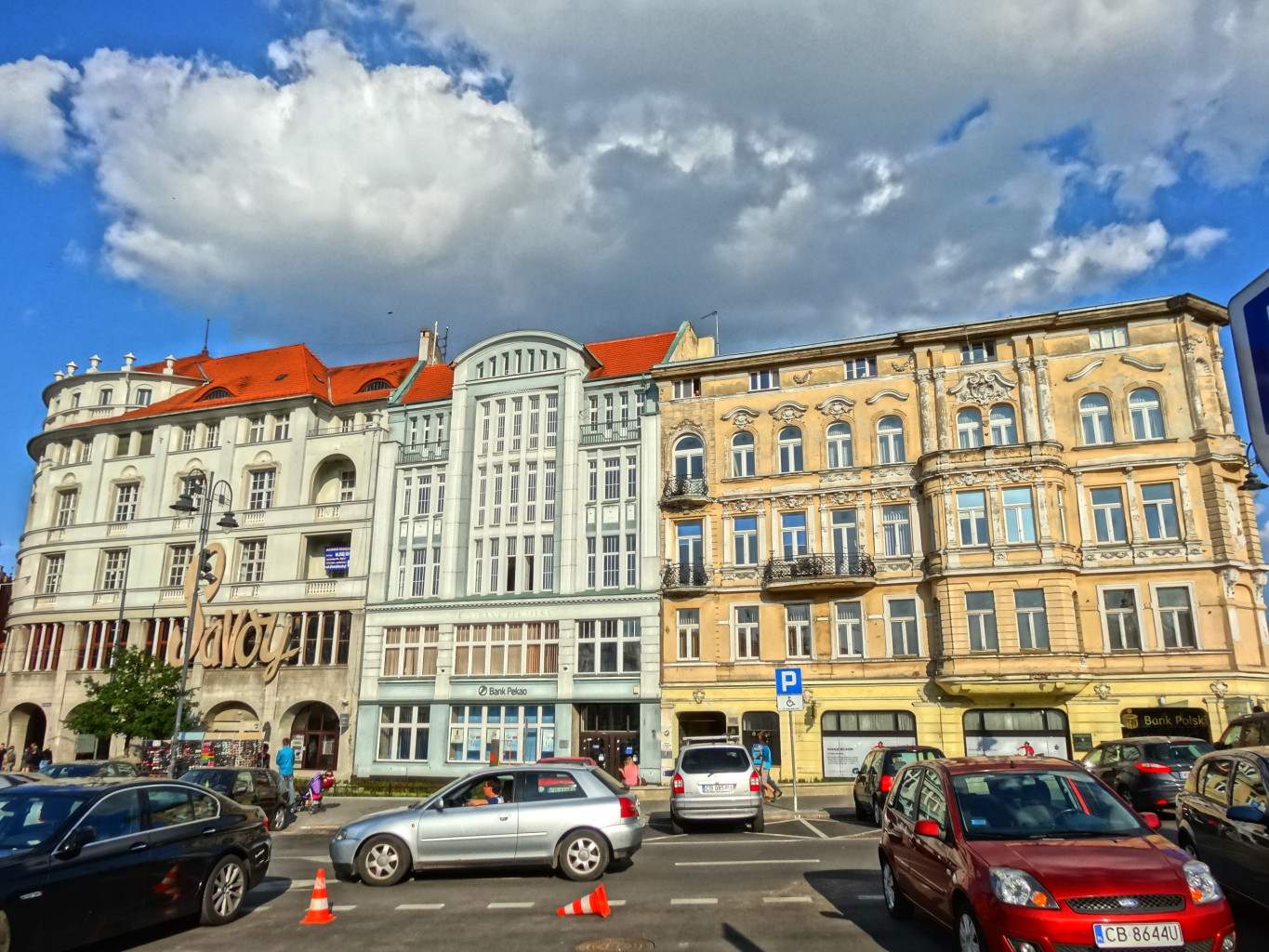
Facades on eastern side of the square

In 1822 the church of the Carmelites was razed, and the first theatre building was built in its place. Since then, the area has always borne the name Theatre Square ("Plac Teatralny").

The building had a chaotic life. Destroyed by a fire in 1835, it was rebuilt and burned again in 1890. Finally, in 1895, the Municipal Theatre was erected, designed by Berlin architect Heinrich Seeling. During this construction, the last relic of the Carmelite monastery (a Gothic tower) was demolished.

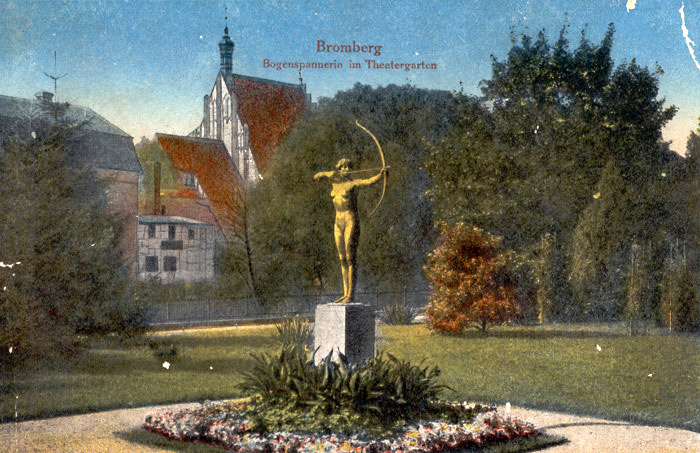
"The Archer" in its original place on Theatre Square

In 1888 the square witnessed the first horsecar; 2 lines joined there. In 1896, a railway network was established to run powered trams. In the beginning of 1901, a 3rd line was added, making the Square the largest interchange in Bydgoszcz. On the eve of World War II, four tram lines were running through the place on daily basis. However, in 1953, these lines lost their importance when a new interchange was set up in the district of Babia Wieś. Rail tracks from the north-south lines were liquidated in 1974. Since then, trams run through the square on an east-west axis, along its northern frontage (Ferdinand Foch Street).

In the garden along the banks of the Brda river was a popular café called "Theatre" ((in Polish) "Teatralną"). In a nearby square, on 18 October 1910, The Archer ((in Polish) Łuczniczka) by Berliner Ferdinand Lepcke was unveiled It is considered one of the symbols of Bydgoszcz. After World War II, the masterpiece was moved to a public garden nearby Gdanska street.

The reconstruction of the Municipal Theatre was an opportunity for modernization of the square. The eastern frontage was rebuilt in 1893-1912, with Neo-Baroque and Modern houses, and a partial modernization also was performed along facades onto Mostowa Street and Focha.

During interwar period, Theatre Square was one of the most important and most prominent in Bromberg, and was often displayed on postcards and in works of local artists. In 1937-1938, the square underwent another renovation.

In 1945, during the battle for the liberation of the city, the Municipal Theatre was hit by shells and its interior burned down. Municipal authorities, mistakenly associating the Theatre with German culture, and had it demolished. Since then, Theatre Square lacks the building from which it derives its name.

Eventually, after demolition, the area was sodded, and in 1959-1961, the square was extended to its current shape. The Archer was moved further north in Gdanska Street.

== Denomination ==
The square had the following names:

- 1872-1920- Theater-Platz;
- 1920-1939- Theater Square;
- 1939-1945- Theater-Platz;
- 1945-1949- Theater Square;
- 1950-1956- Plac Wyzwolenia (Liberation Square);
- 1956-1990- Plac Zjednoczenia (Unity Square);
- Since 1990 Theatre Square.

== Current status ==
The Square is partially used in the western part (parking lot), and in the eastern part (linking with Mostowa Street). The lawned area, as one of the most exposed places in downtown Bydgoszcz is still waiting for development. City authorities are planning new buildings of high architectural value, in particular an extension of the Opera Nova. On July 19, 2013 two fogging pergolas have been set up.

== Buildings of interest ==
=== Julius Rosenthal's Tenement, at 2 ===
1893-1905, by Joseph Święcicki

Neo-Baroque

Registered on the Kuyavian-Pomeranian Voivodeship Heritage list: Nr.601409, Reg. A/1141, May 6, 1992

Before the current building, a hotel stood there, Hotel Royal , at then Theaterplatz 4 . Constructed around 1870, the establishment ran from 1887 to 1893. Once razed, this plot on the corner of Stary Port Street 1-3 welcomed the project of Joseph Święcicki in 1893 for Julius Rosenthal's heirs, a businessman. The aim was to house a Department store, "Hohenzollern" and an apartment. The building was completed in 1894, with its Neo-Baroque décor, trademark of Bromberg architect. In 1910, the northern end was razed to build a modern Department store designed by Fritz Weidner. In 2010, a memorial plaque has been unveiled to commemorate dr. Bronisław Koch (1913-1988), a famous local lawyer who lived there.

In the 1930s, gables were demolished and decoration moved to the top of the cornice. In 2011, a thorough refurbishing has been performed on the facade, exposing its initial splendor.

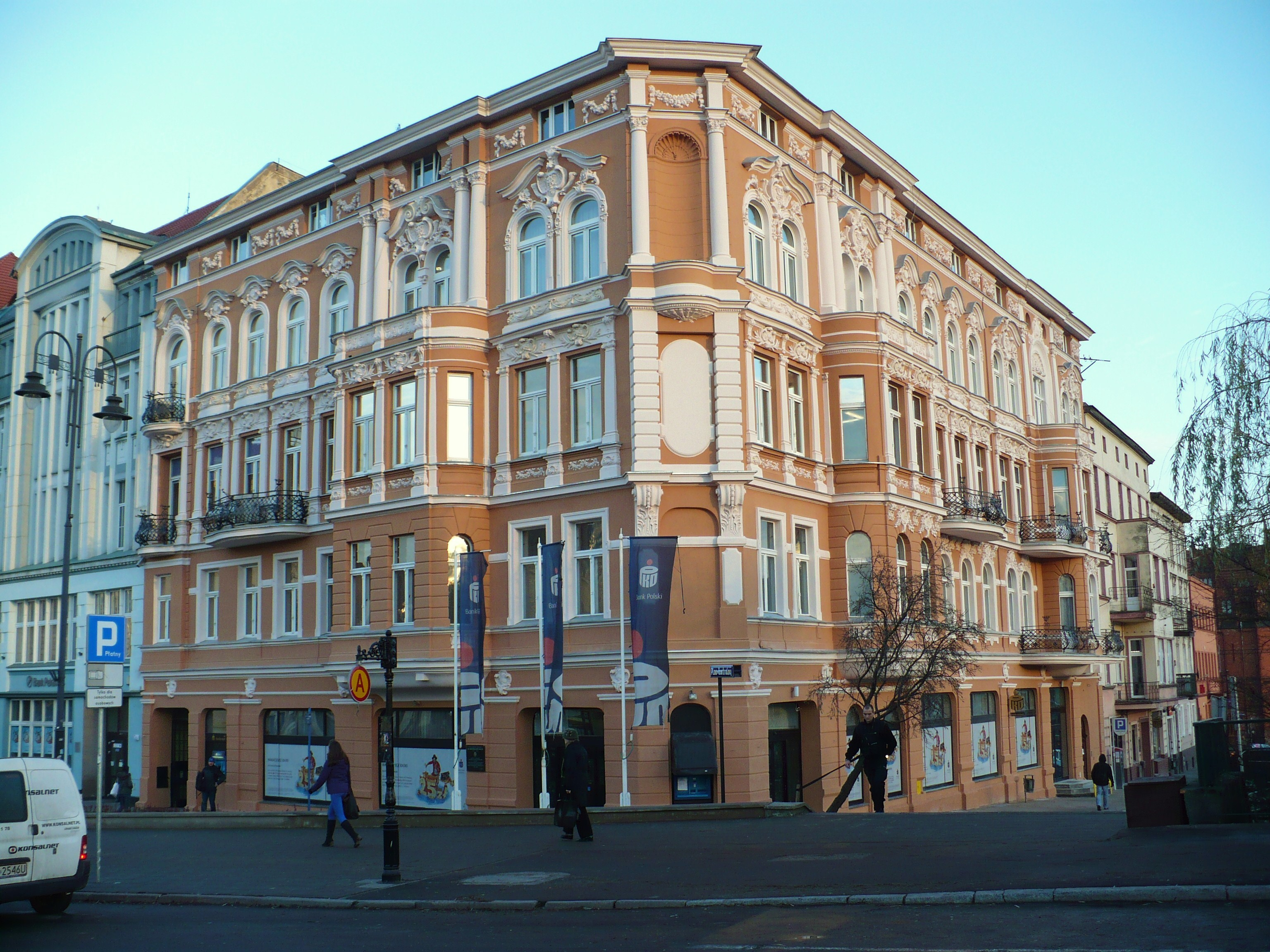
View of the corner

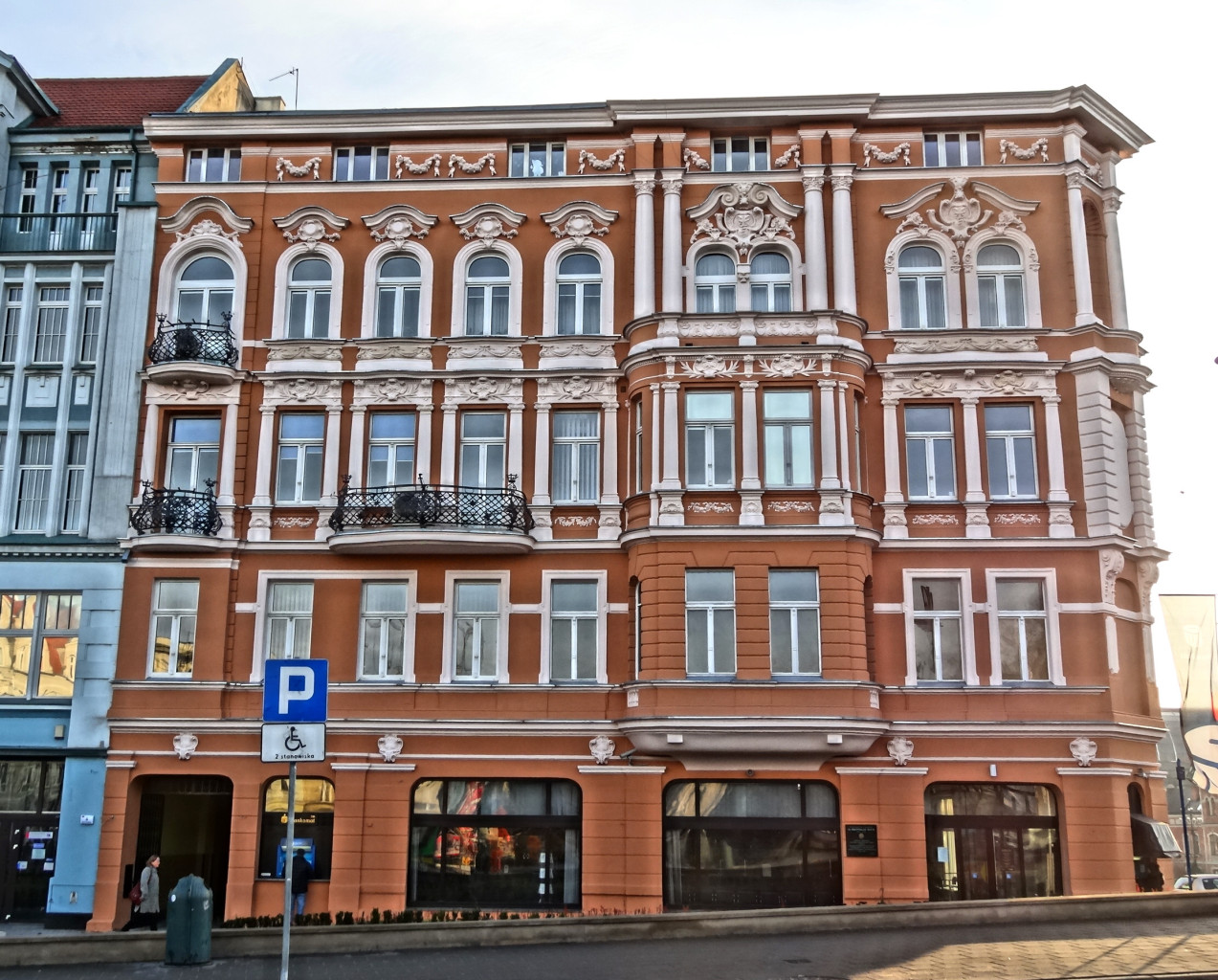
Facade onto Theatre square

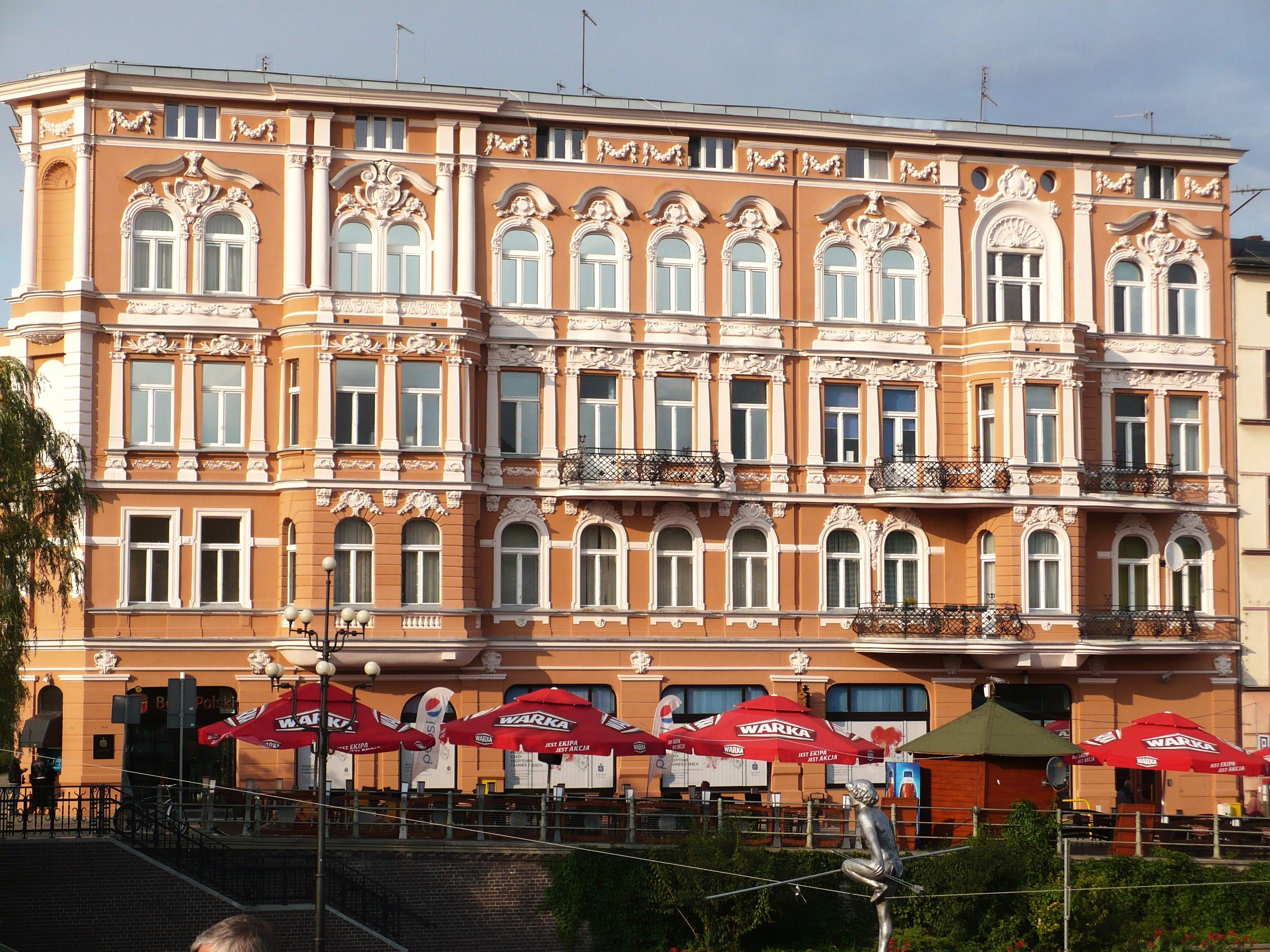
Facade onto Brda river

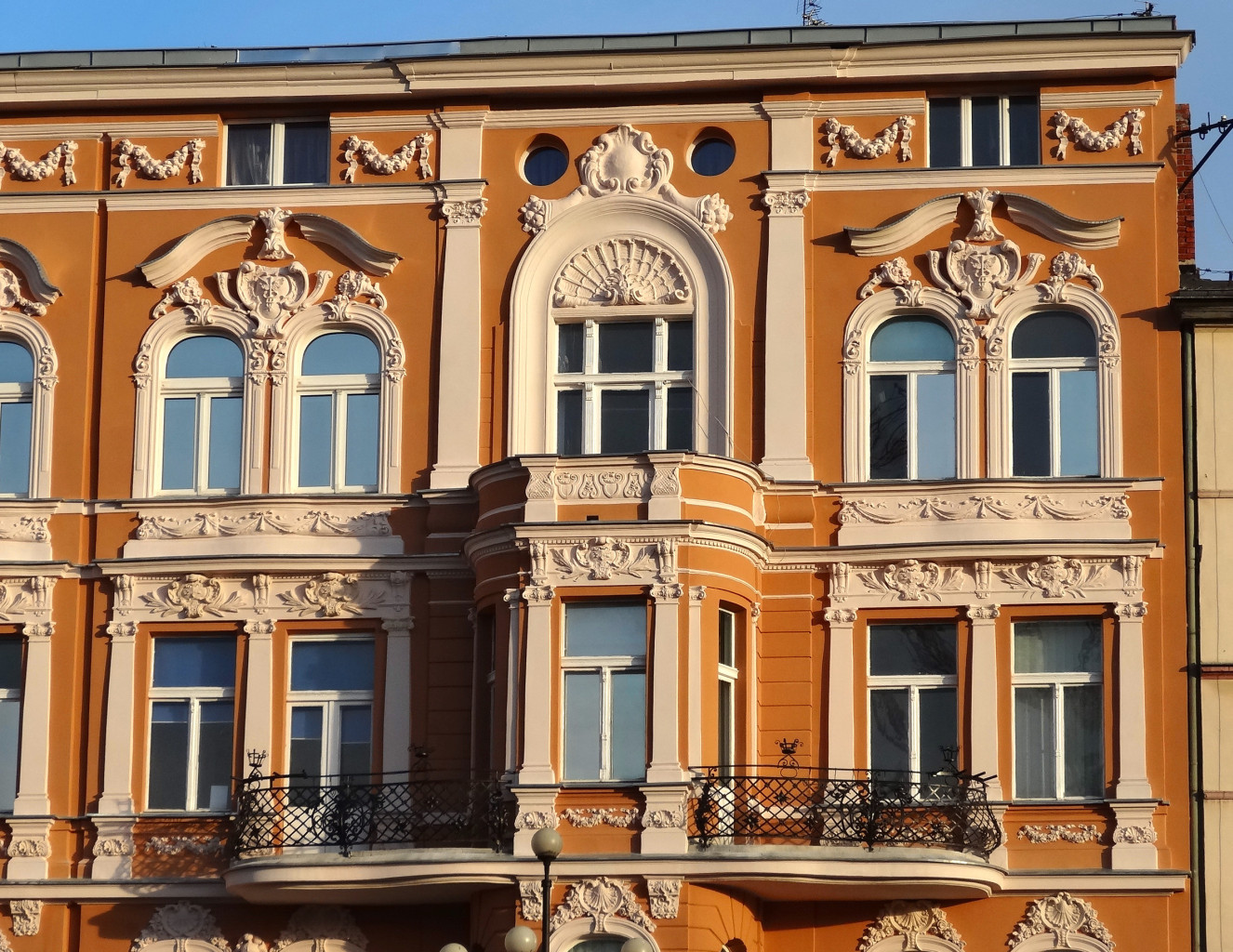
Detail of the facade ornament

=== Theatre square 4 ===
February 28, 1911, by Fritz Weidner

Modernism

The building, realized according to the design of Fritz Weidner, housed at its time the Brandt Department store, the second one in the city, after Jedynak on Gdanska Street. The client was Max Zweininger, owner of a famous hat manufactory who was living on Focha street 2. The edifice is now the headquarters of Bank Pekao SA.

The impressive and modern facade has survived till today, in spite of some minor changes: it is reminiscing of its original features.

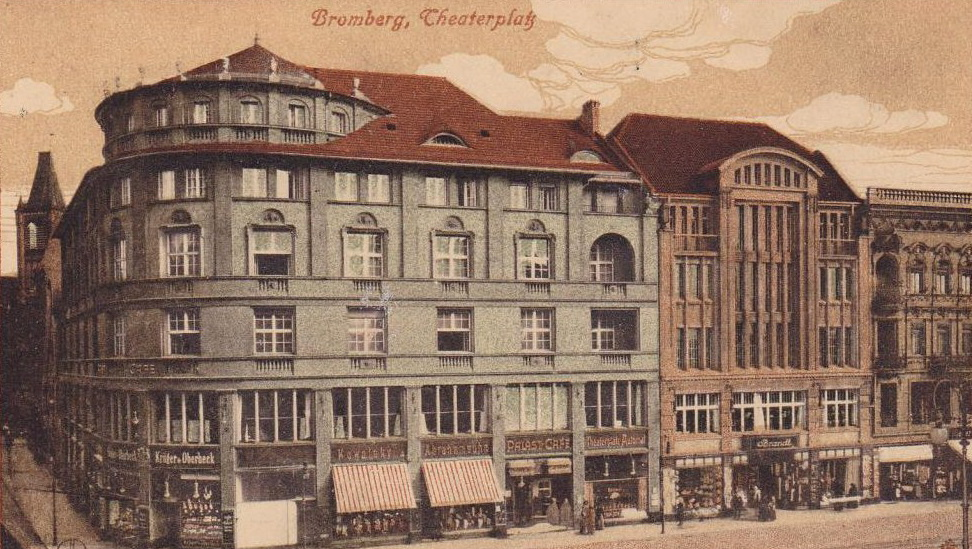
Facades of buildings at Nr.4 and 6 in 1917

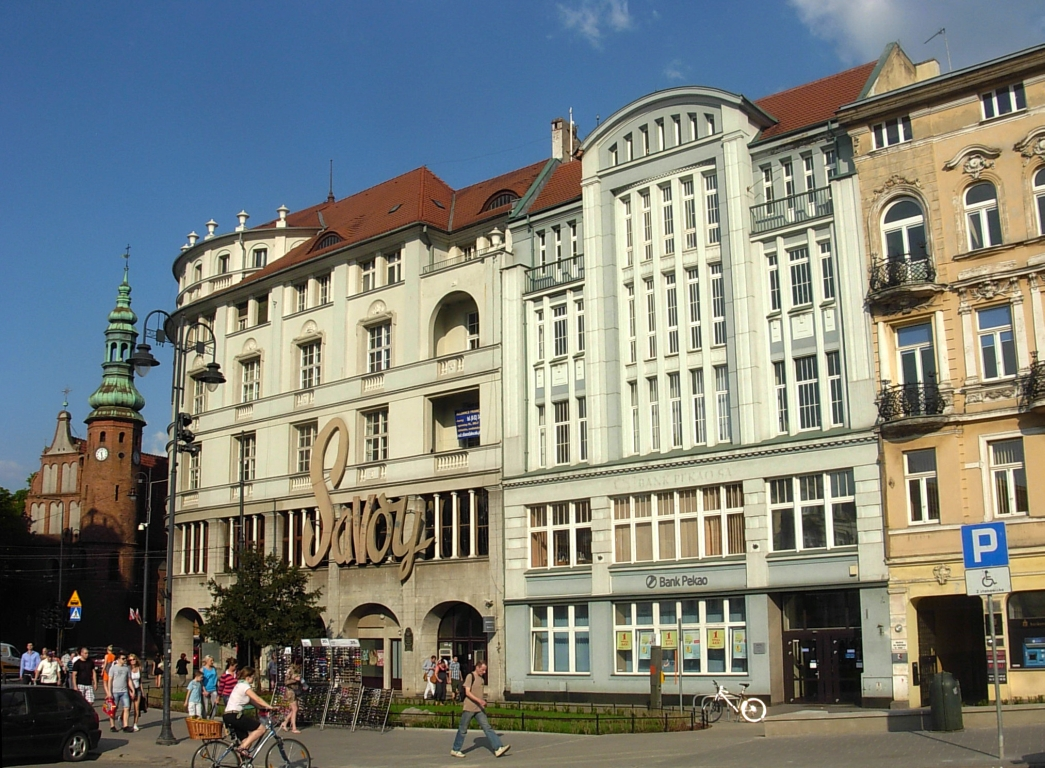
View from the square

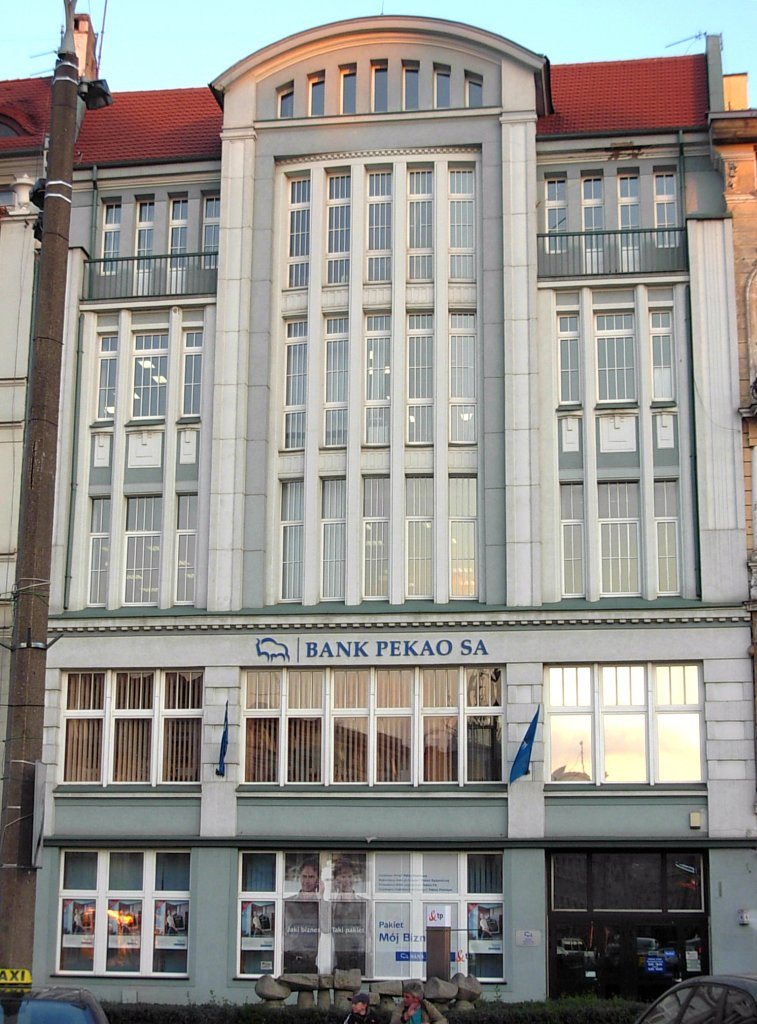
Frontage onto the square

=== Theatre square 6 ===
1913, by Heinrich Gross

Modernism

This tenement stands at the corner of Jagiellońska street and Theatre Square. From 1789 to 1800, on the place stood a storehouse and a stable. In 1853, a new building was erected, it survived until 1912. This year, a new edifice has been built by Rudolf Kern following a design of architect Heinrich Gross: the client was Otto Pfefferkorn, owner of a successful furniture factory. Minor works have been performed in 1922-1923. In 1940, arcades designed by Jan Kossowski have been added at ground level at the request of the Nazi authorities: the project comprised also the opposite building with the same features.

The address has housed for a long time the Alliance Française offices of Bydgoszcz. Today, the place is famous for the night club "Savoy" that occupies a whole floor.

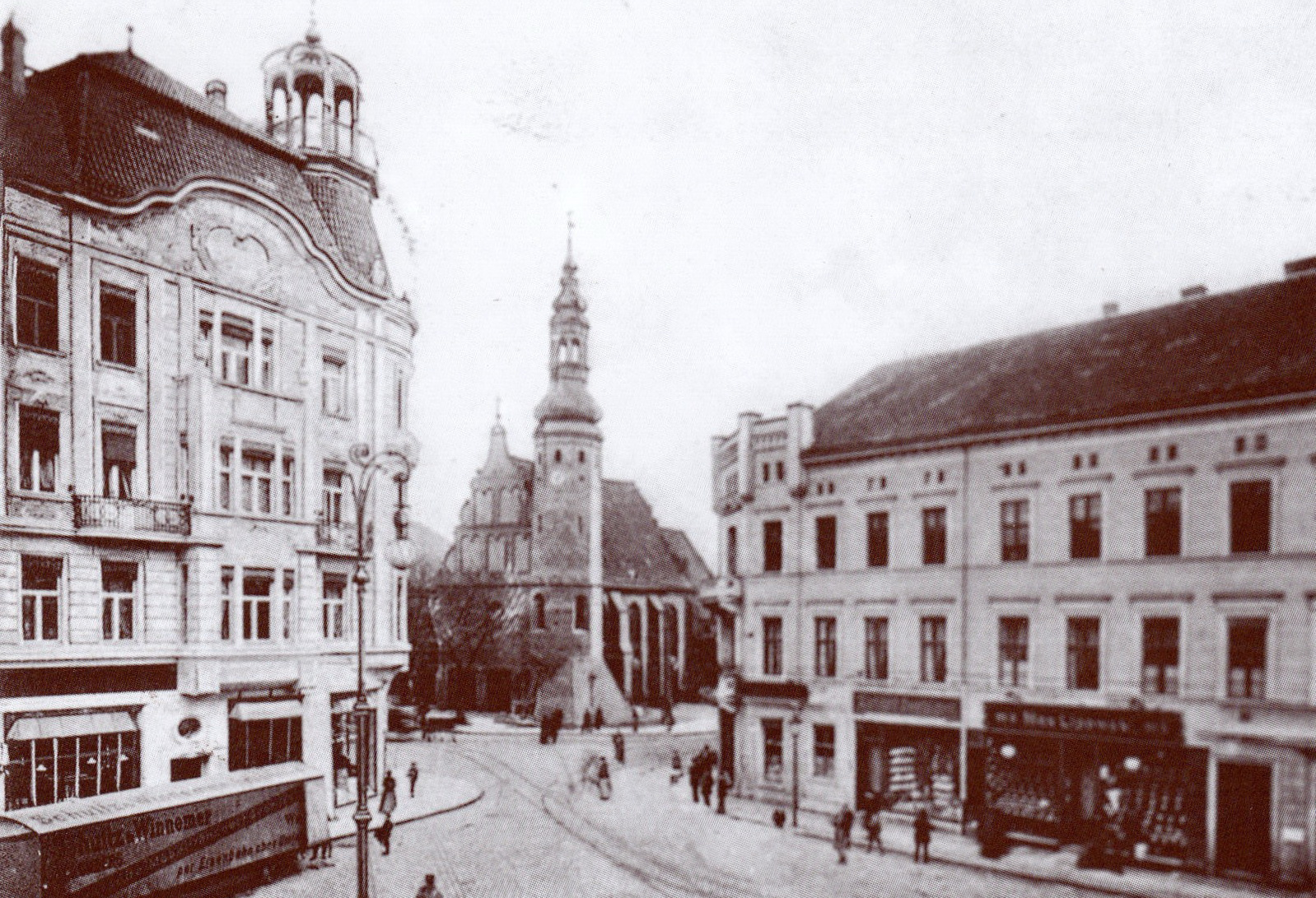
Theatre Square Nr.6 ca. 1902. Notice the old corner house.

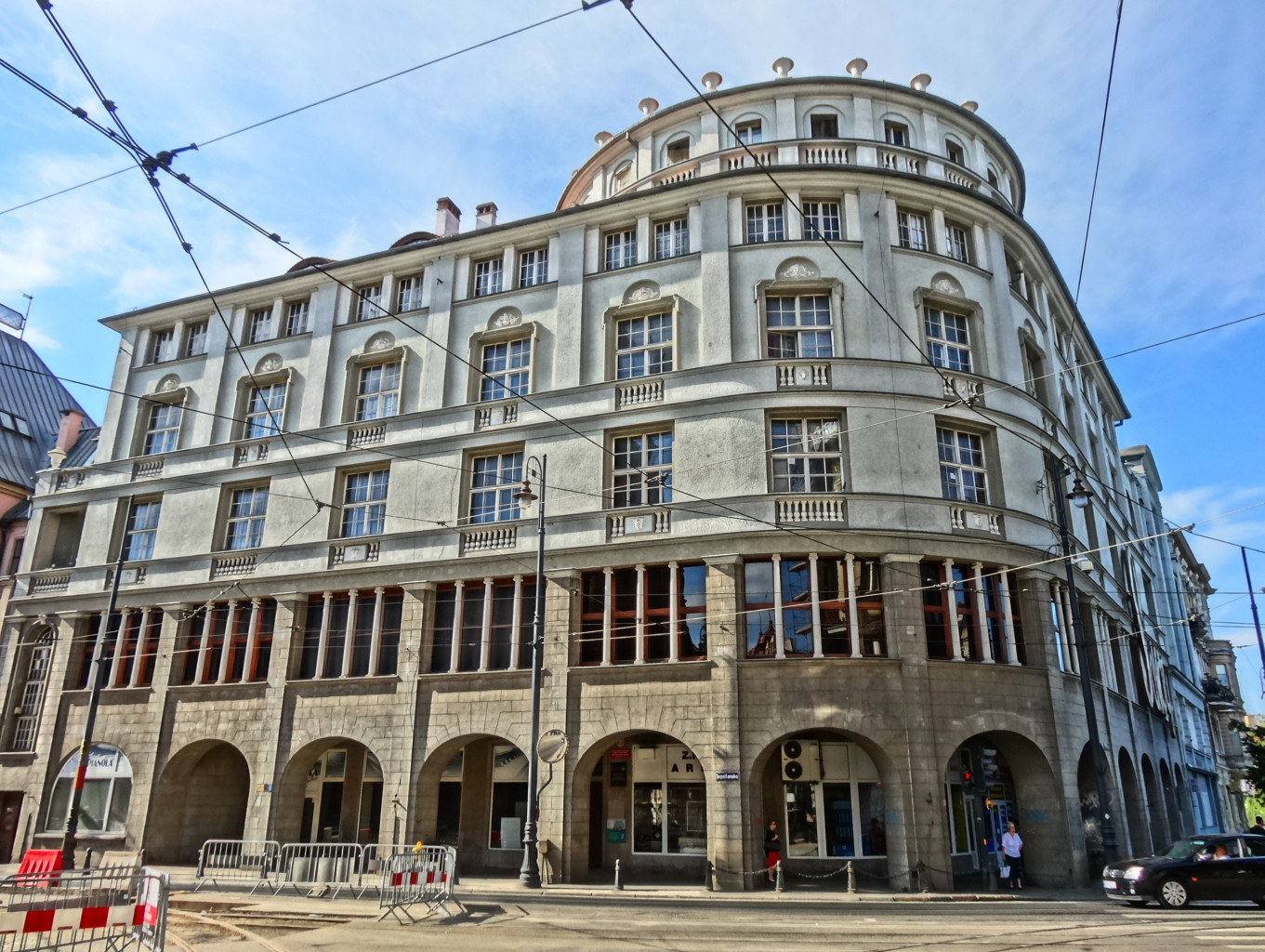
View from Gdanska Street

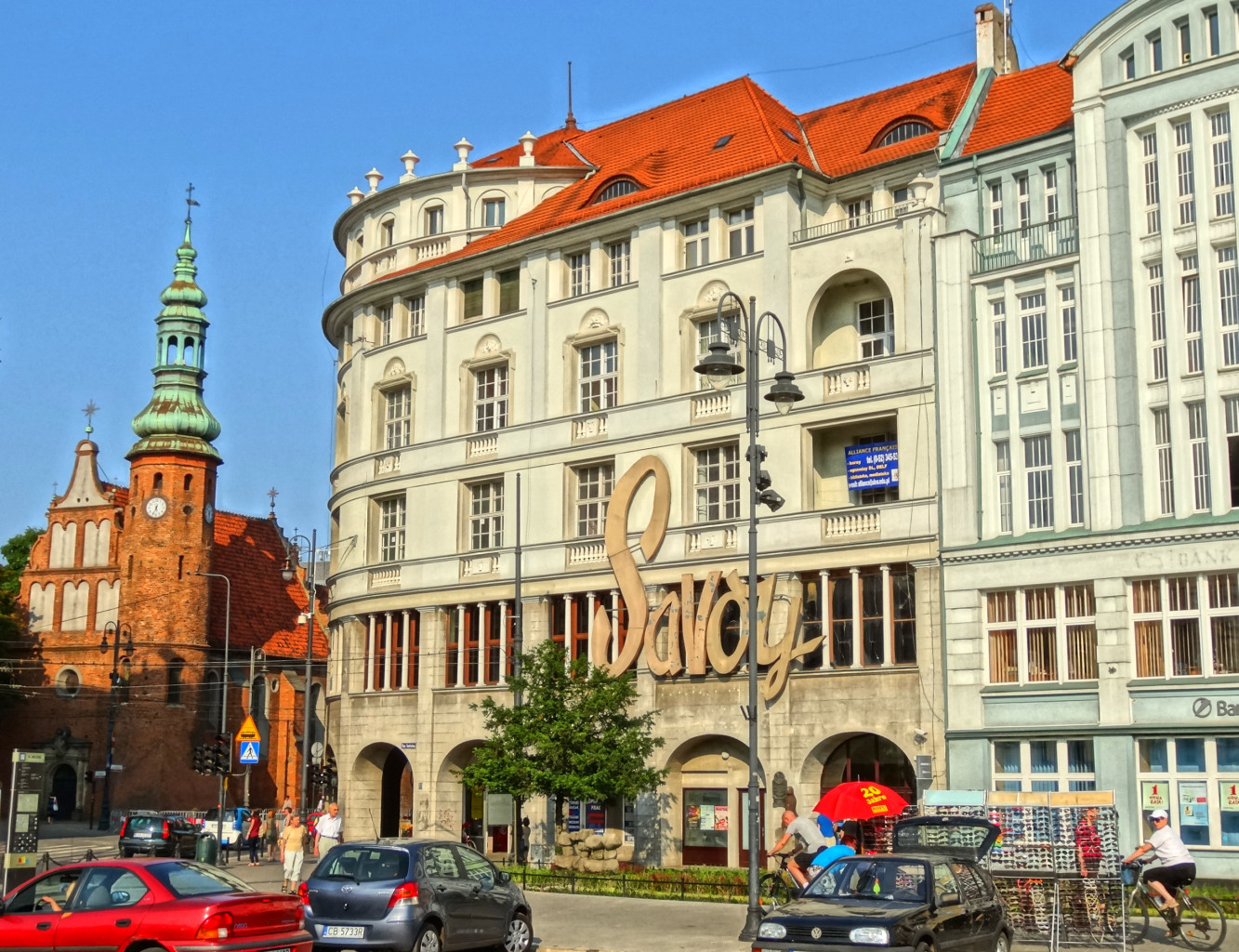
View from the Square

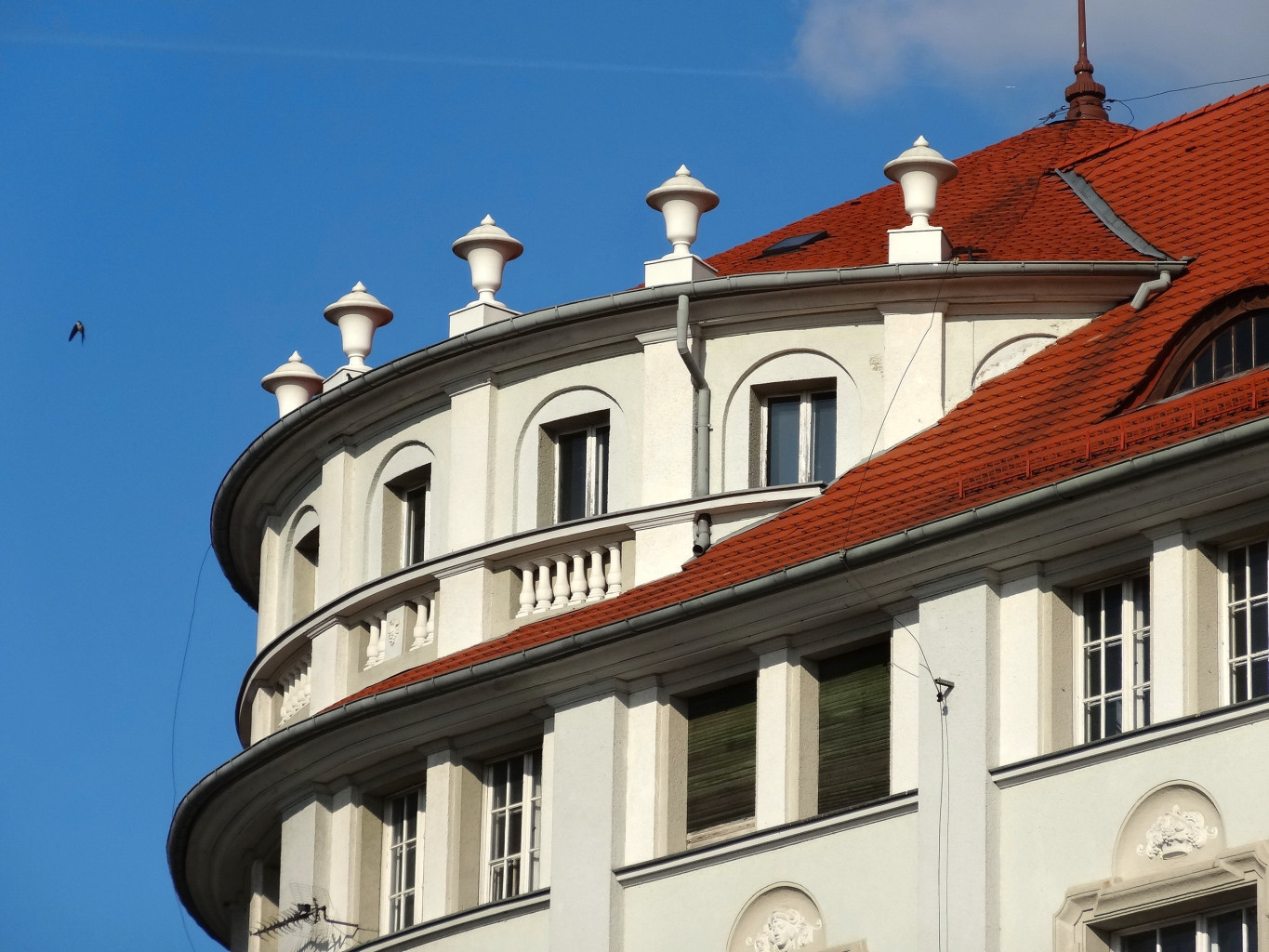
Detail of topping rotunda

=== Max Zweininger Tenement at 2 Focha Street, corner with Theatre Square ===
1901-1902, by Karl Bergner

Vienna Secession, Eclecticism

The house has been built between 1901 and 1902 for Max Zweininger, the owner of a famous hat manufactory in Bromberg, living at Elisabethstraße 55, now 4 Śniadecki Street. The building was designed by Bydgoszcz architect Karl Bergner on the site of an earlier building originating from the first half of the 19th century. On the ground floor were established shops, including hats and furs retailers.

In 1940, a ground floor arcade has been added, designed by Jan Kossowski, as he did at the same period on opposite building (Theatre square 6).

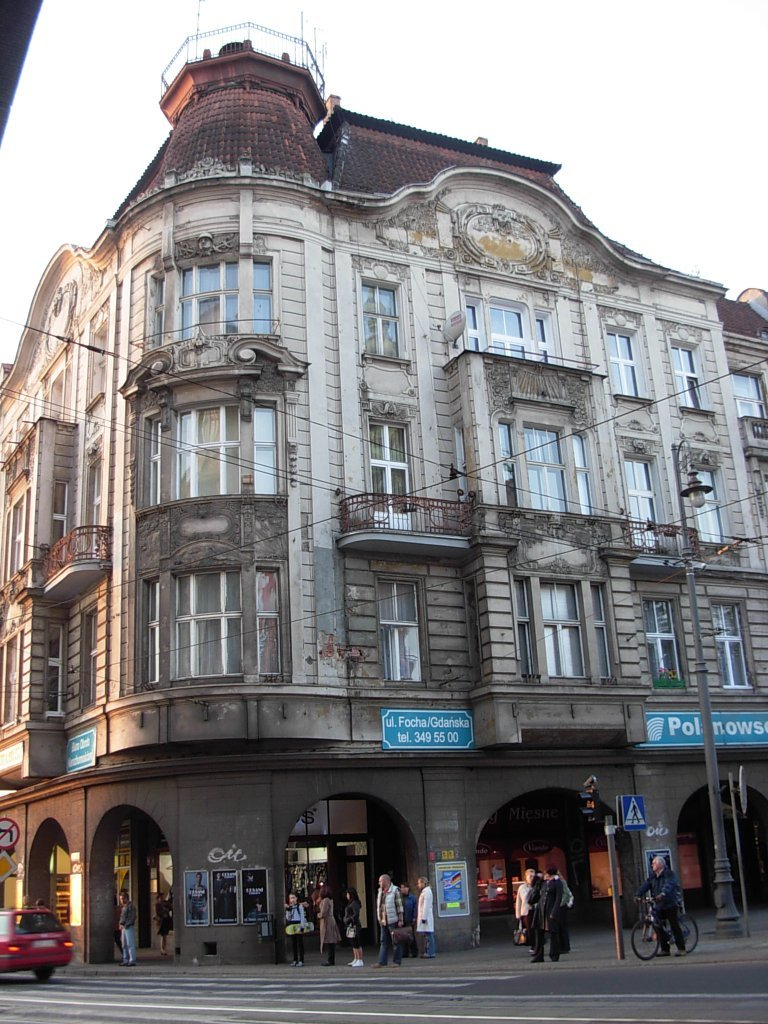
View from Jagellonska street

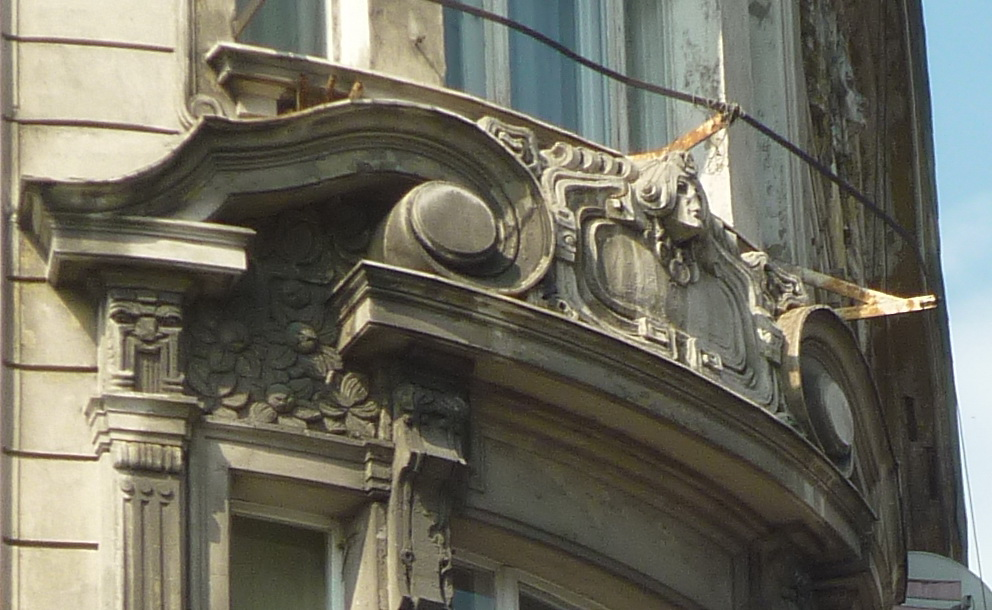
Detail of corner ornament

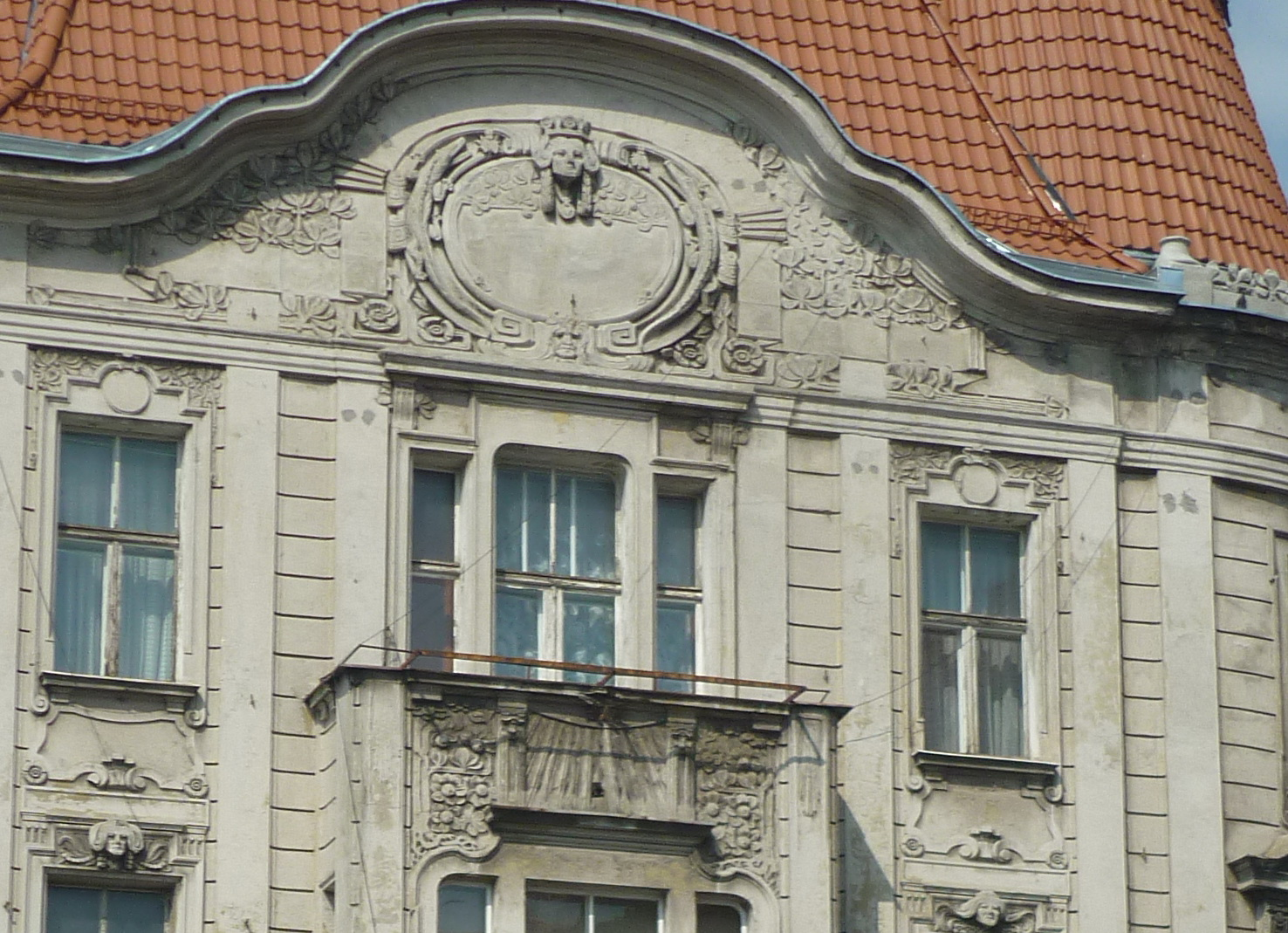
Detail of the gable

=== Focha Street 4, on Theatre Square ===
1901-1902, by Karl Bergner

Vienna Secession, Eclecticism

Registered on the Kuyavian-Pomeranian Voivodeship Heritage list: Nr.601292, Reg. A/849, April 22, 1996

The building at then-Wilhelmstraße 17 has been built to be a renting tenement, owned by Mr. Rapiewocki, a merchant.

The elevation echoes the one at Nr.2, by the same architect: identical bay window, flanked by wrought iron balconies. Even the decoration is alike: figures, cartouches, ornaments and scrollworks, up to the facade pediment.

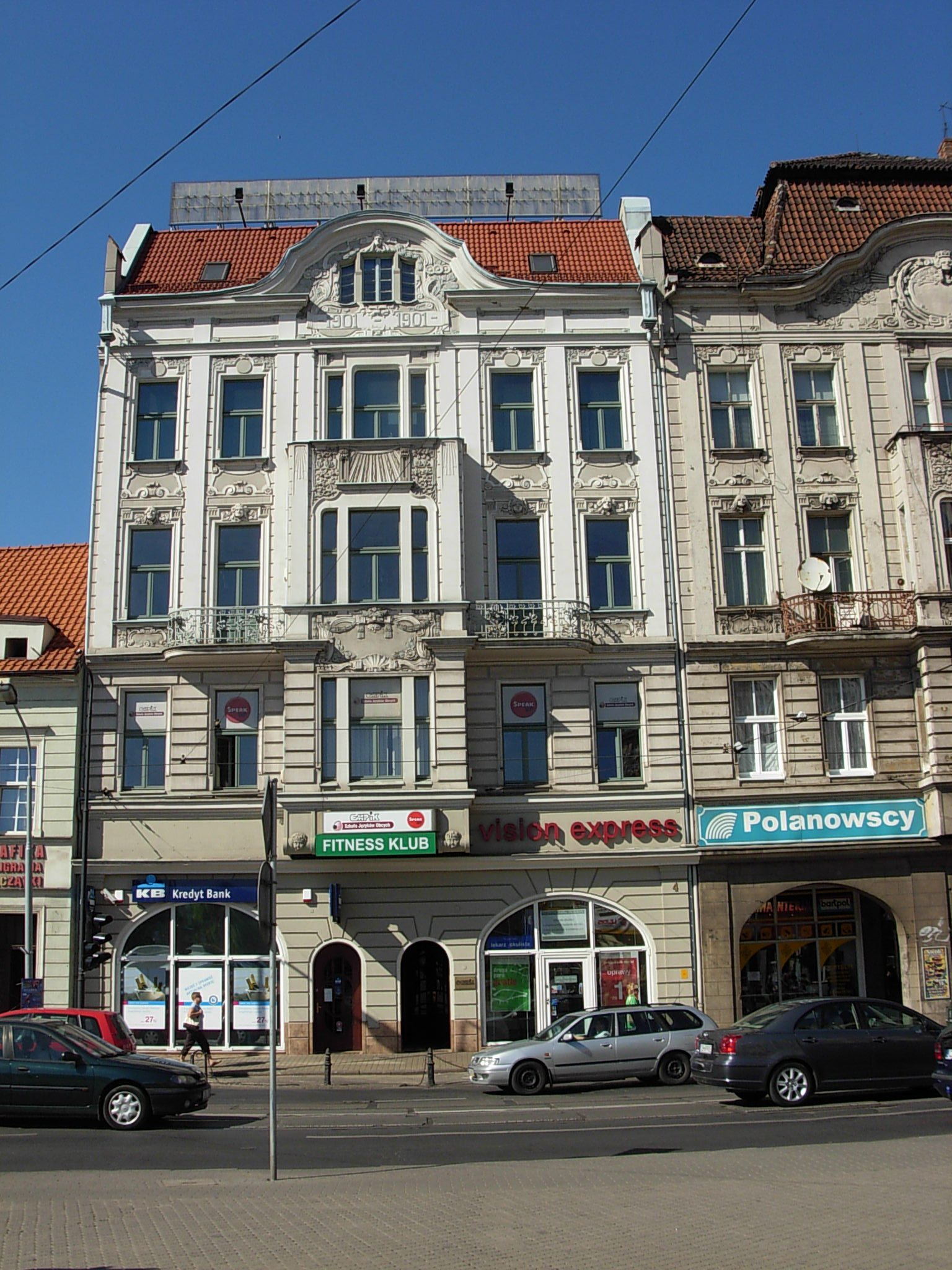
View from Theatre Square

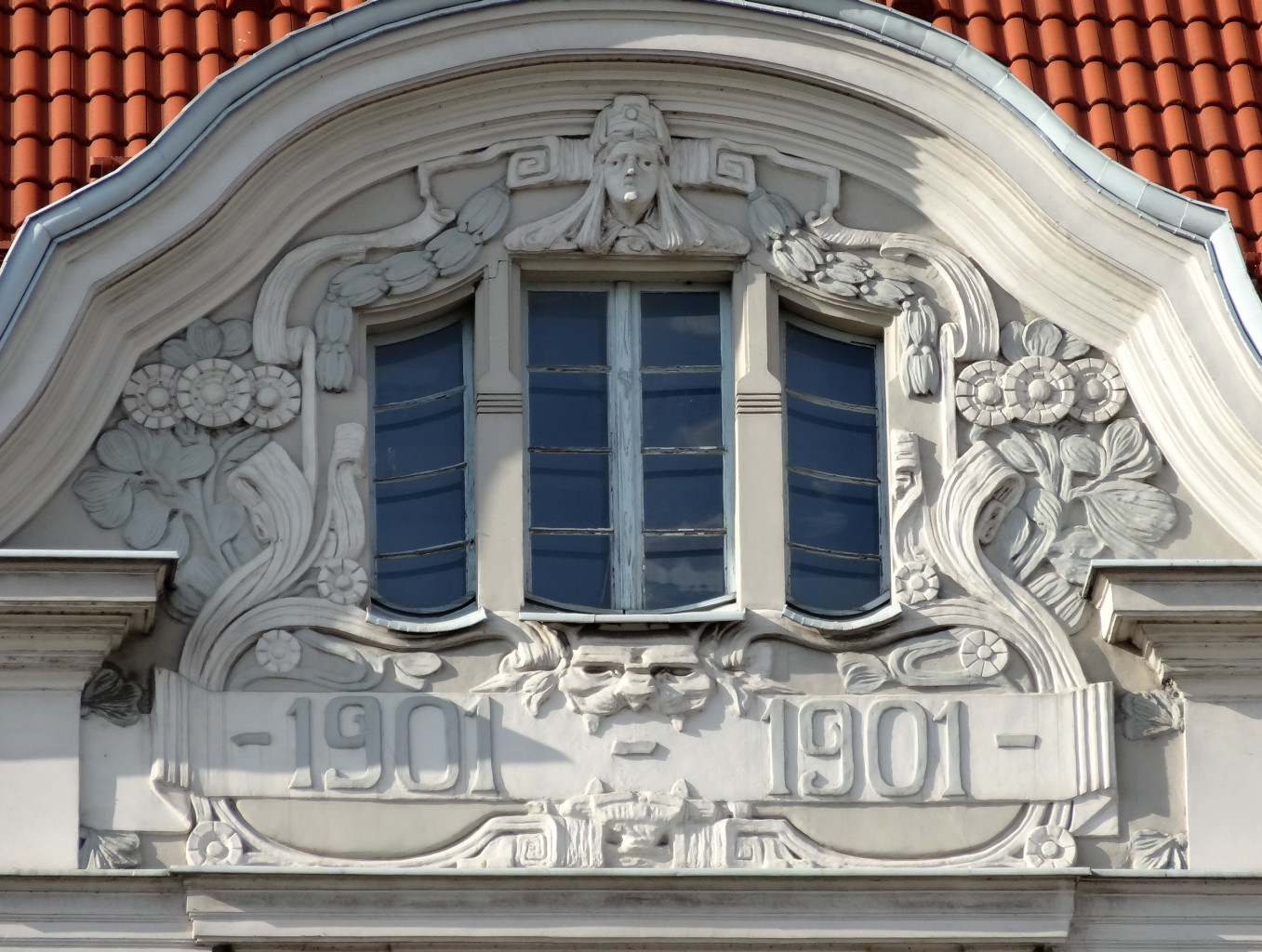
Detail of gable

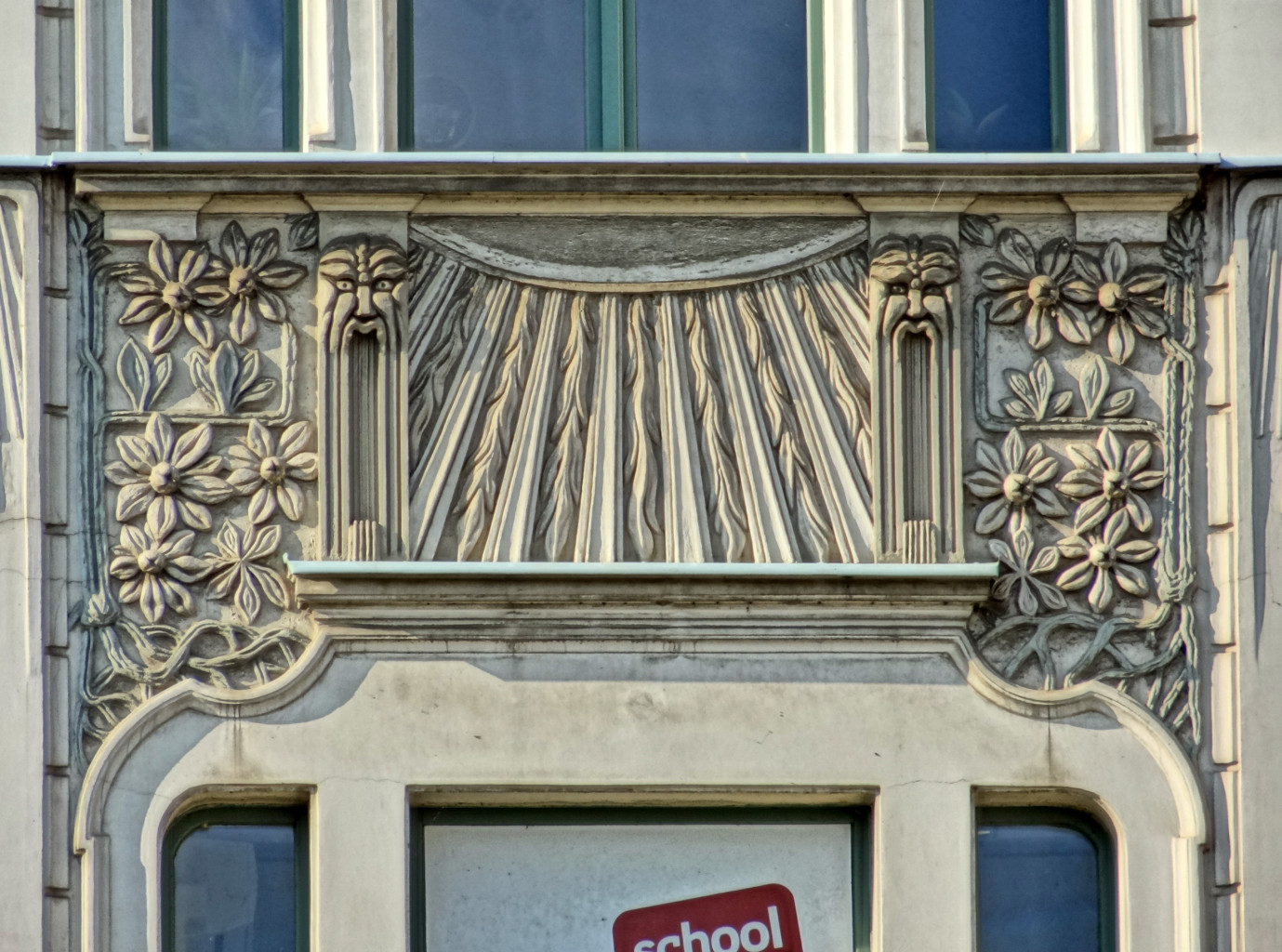
Facade detail

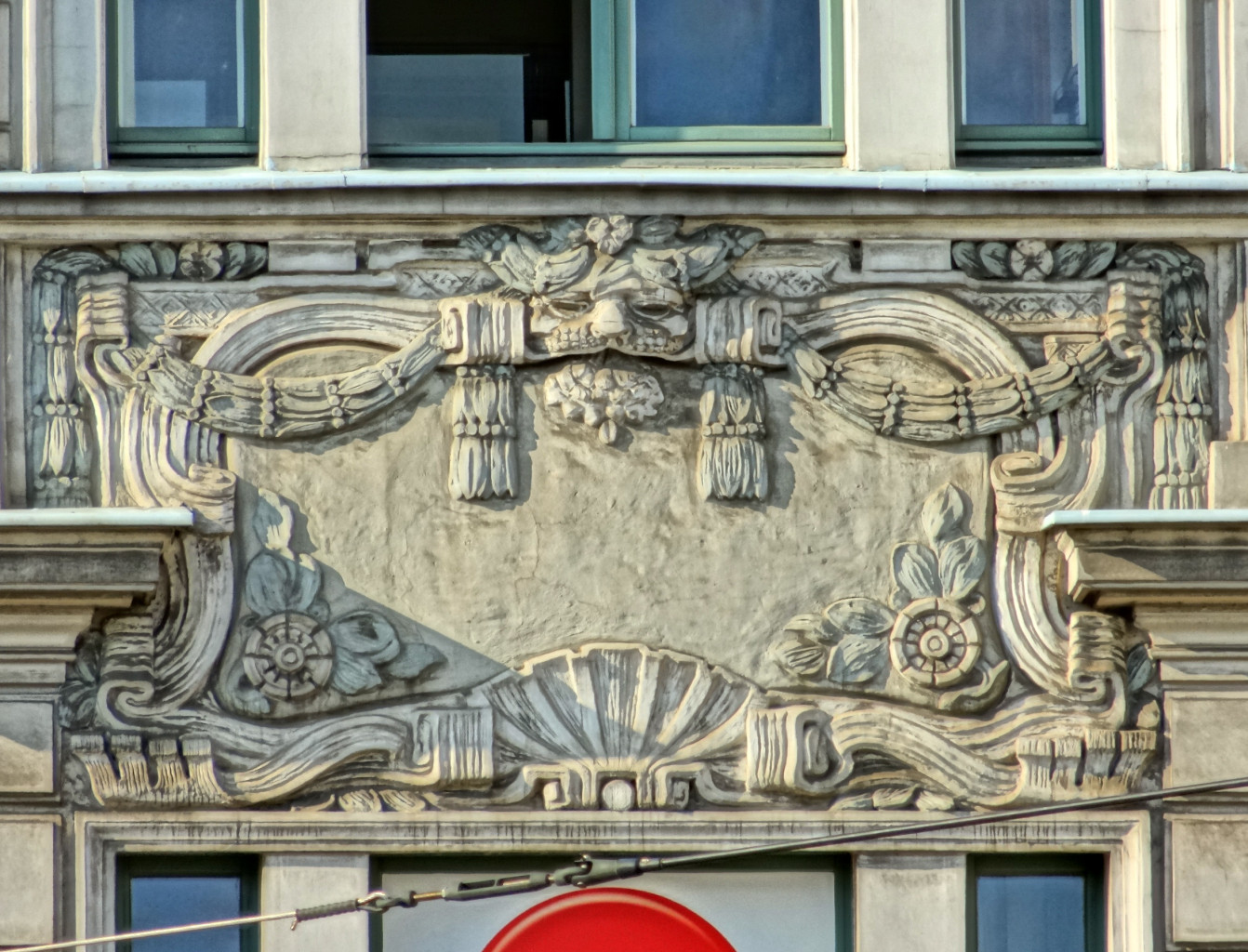
Facade detail

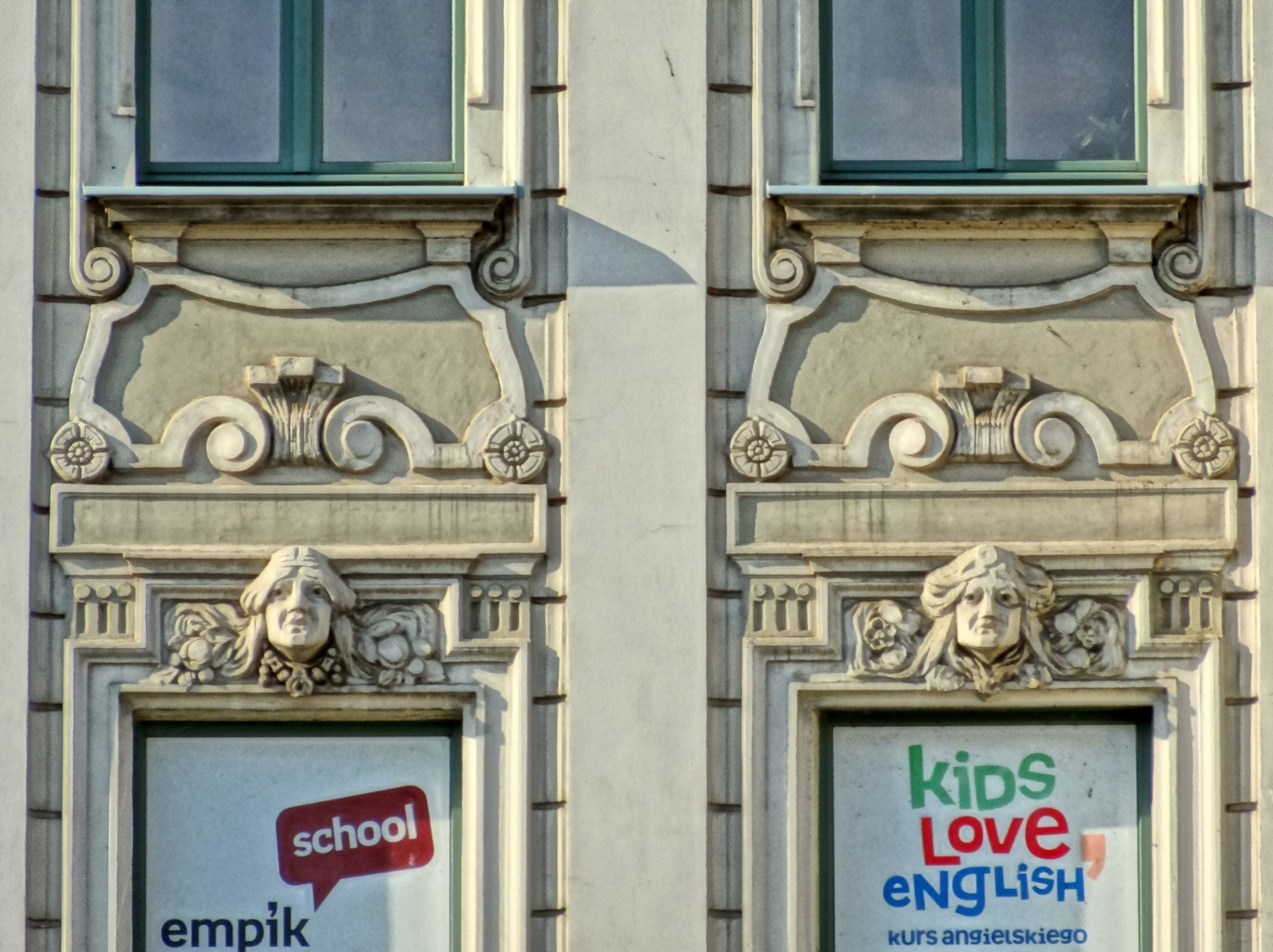
Facade detail

=== 6 Focha Street, on Theatre Square ===
1825-1850

Neoclassical architecture

The first owner of the house at Wilhelmstraße 16 was a famous printer, Albert Dittmann, local tycoon and successful entrepreneur in Bromberg. His printhouse covered the back yard of Focha 6 and extended through the block to today's building at 13 Dworcowa Street. The company was active until the outbreak of World War II.

The house design is very close to the one at 40 Gdanska Street, built at the same time.

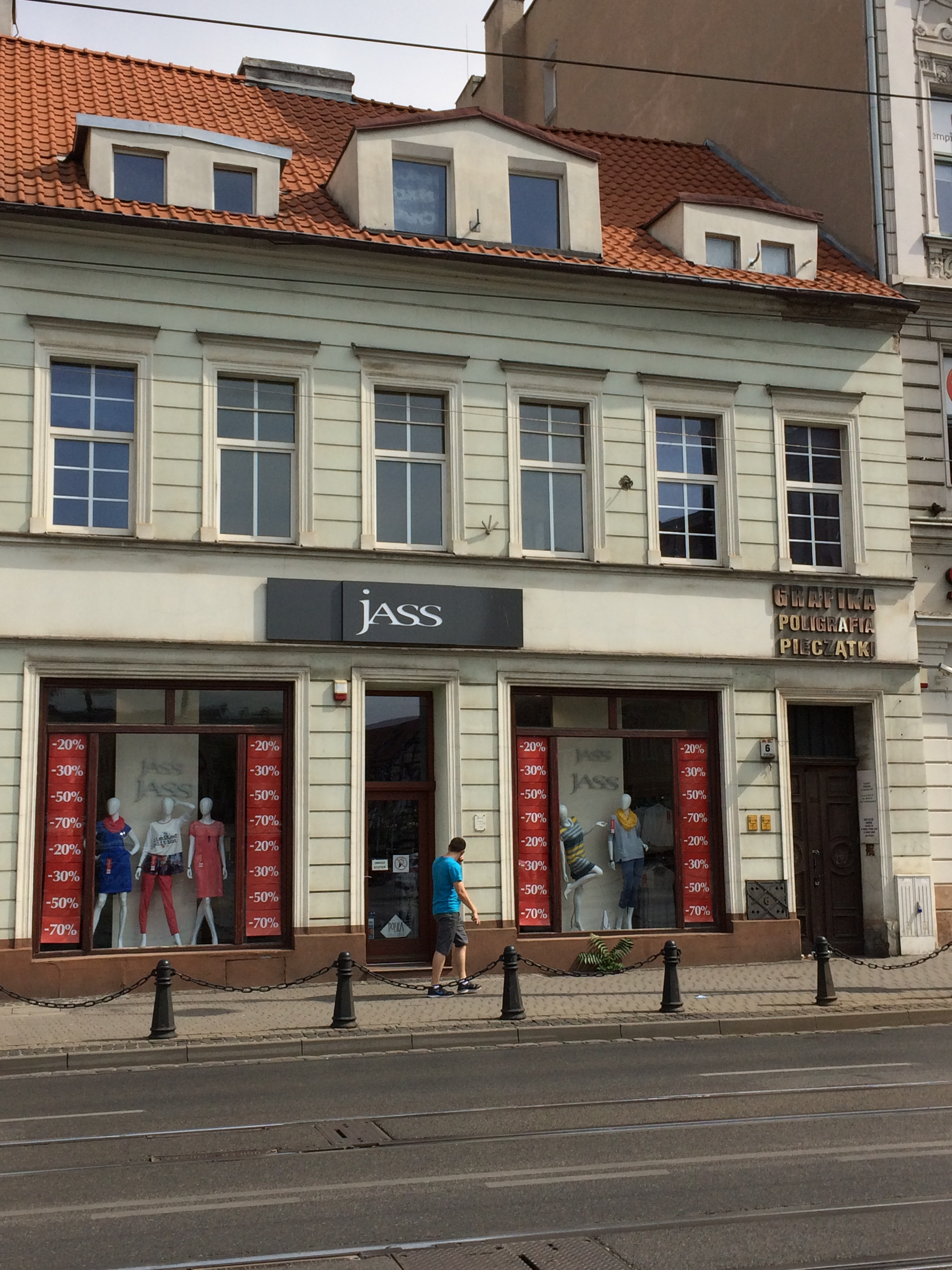
Main elevation from Theatre Square

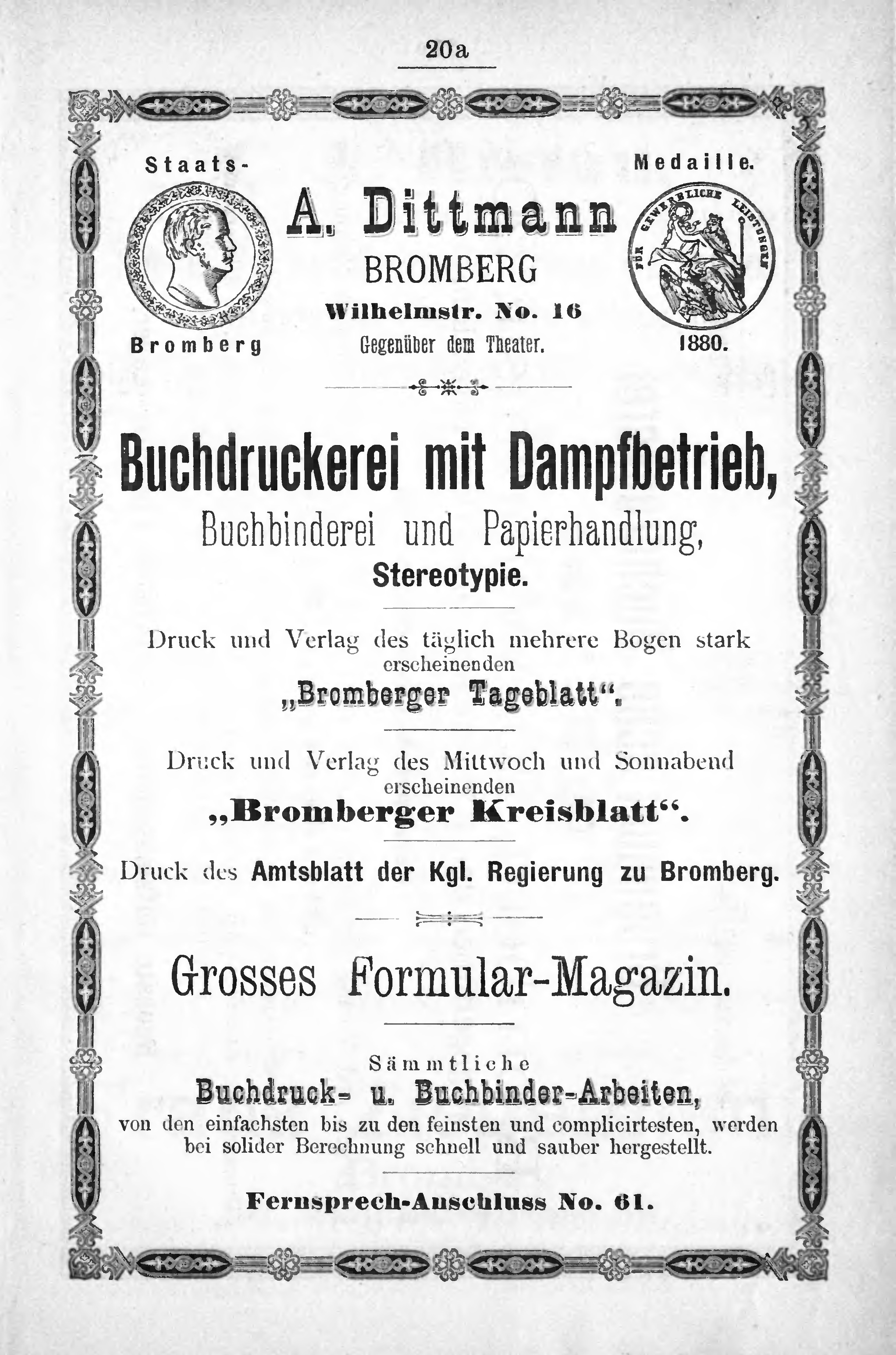
Advertising for Dittmann printhouse, 1890

=== 8 Focha Street, on Theatre Square ===
1875-1900

Neoclassical architecture

The first owner of the house at Wilhelmstraße 15 was Louis Mallachow, a dentist living at Danzuiger straße 14. Later on, in the 1880s the building became the property of Theodore Joop, a famous photograph who had its workshop there. His firm survived his death, taken over by Paul Nawrotzki and Emil Wehr.

The frontage displays typical neo-classical architectural features.

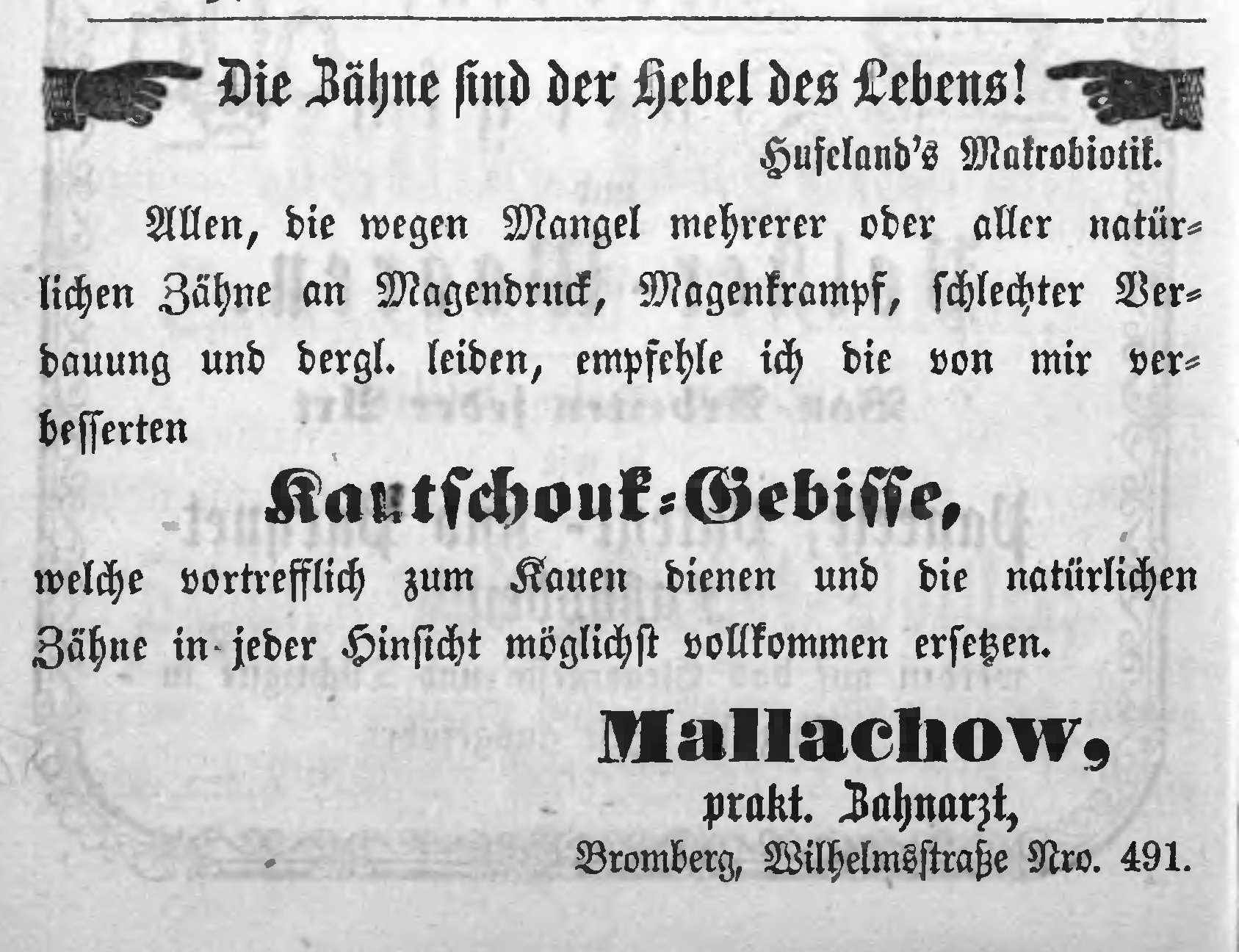
Advertisement for Dr. Mallachow in 1864

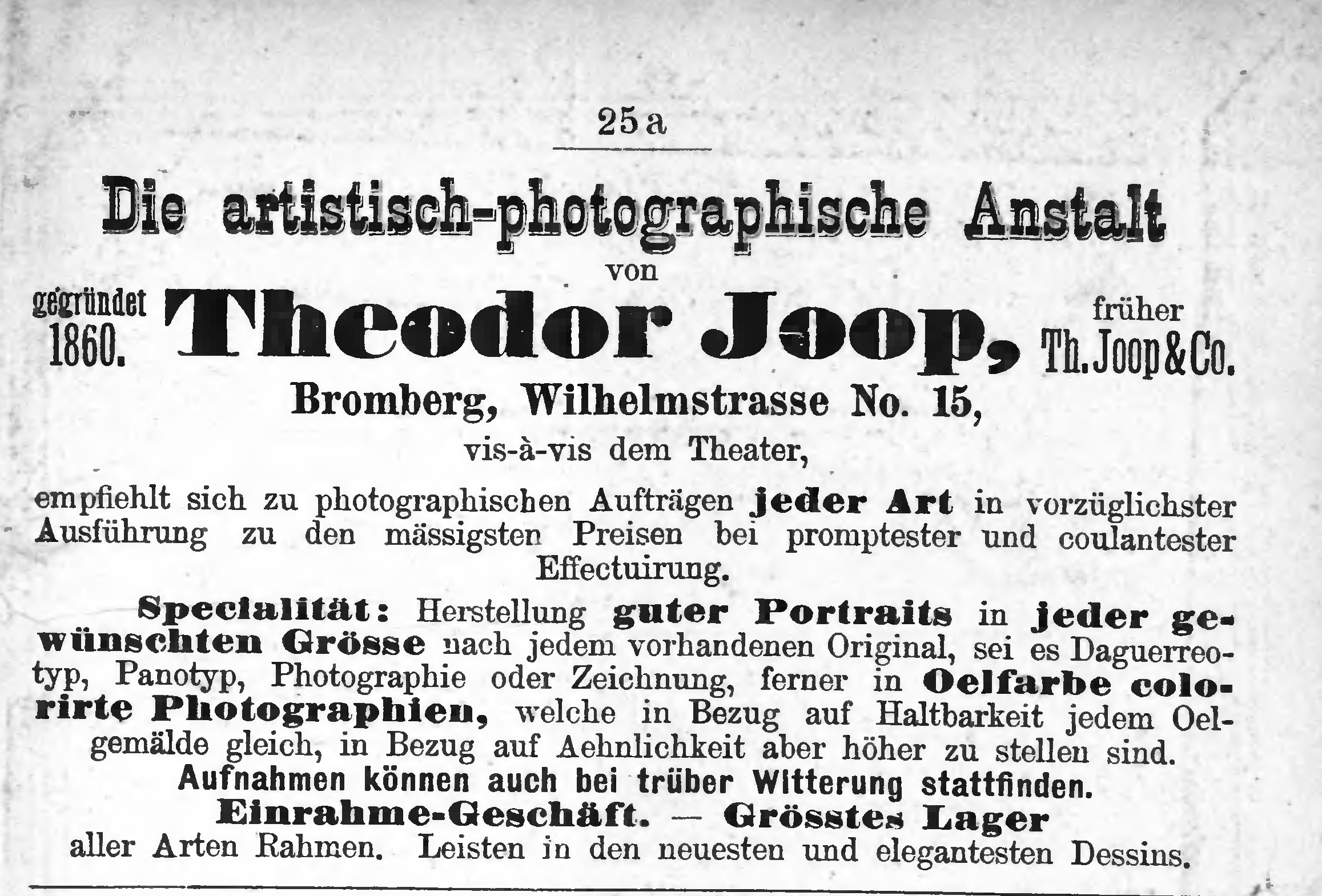
Advertising for Th. Joop in 1890

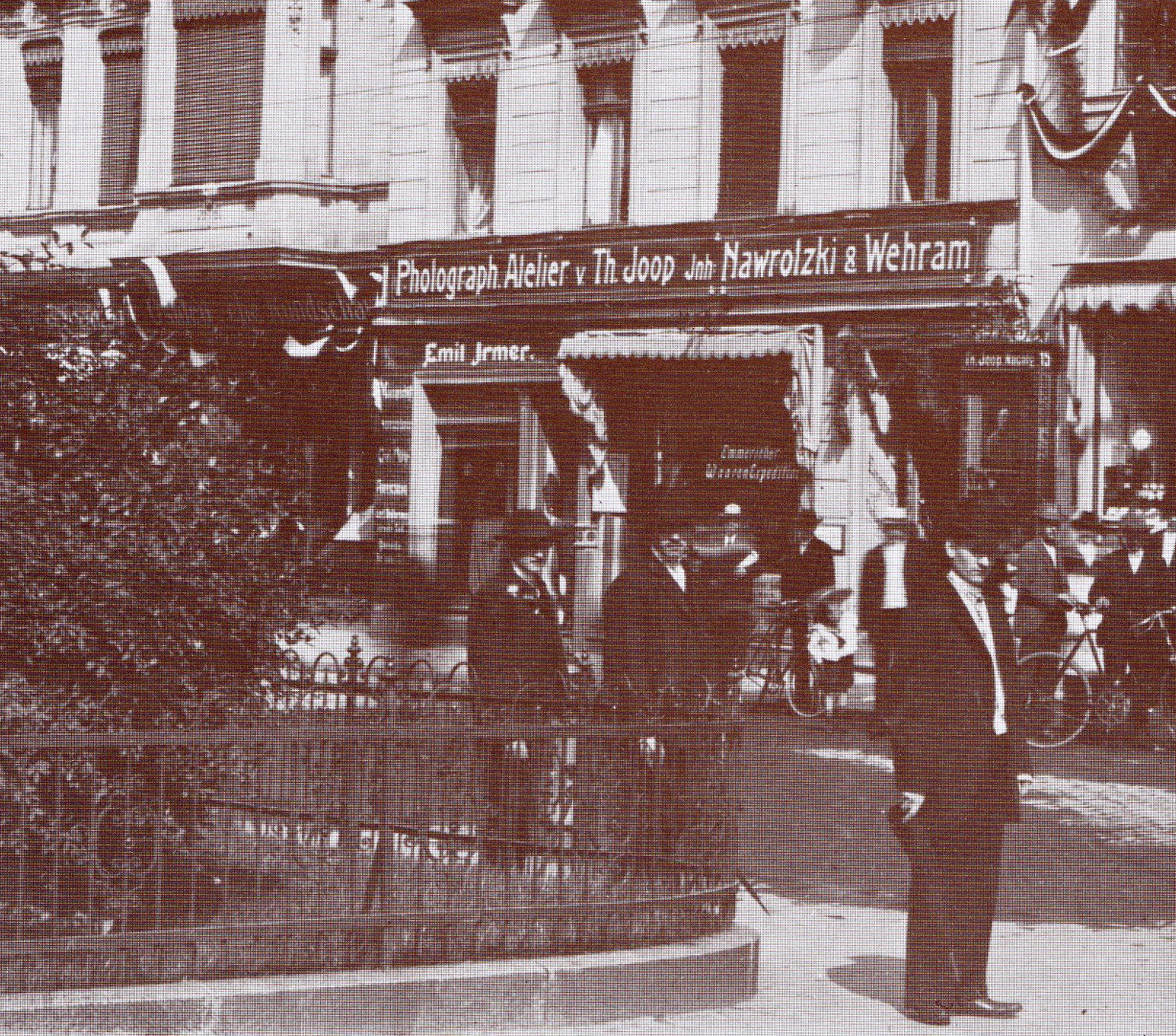
Joop workshop at Nr.8 in 1907

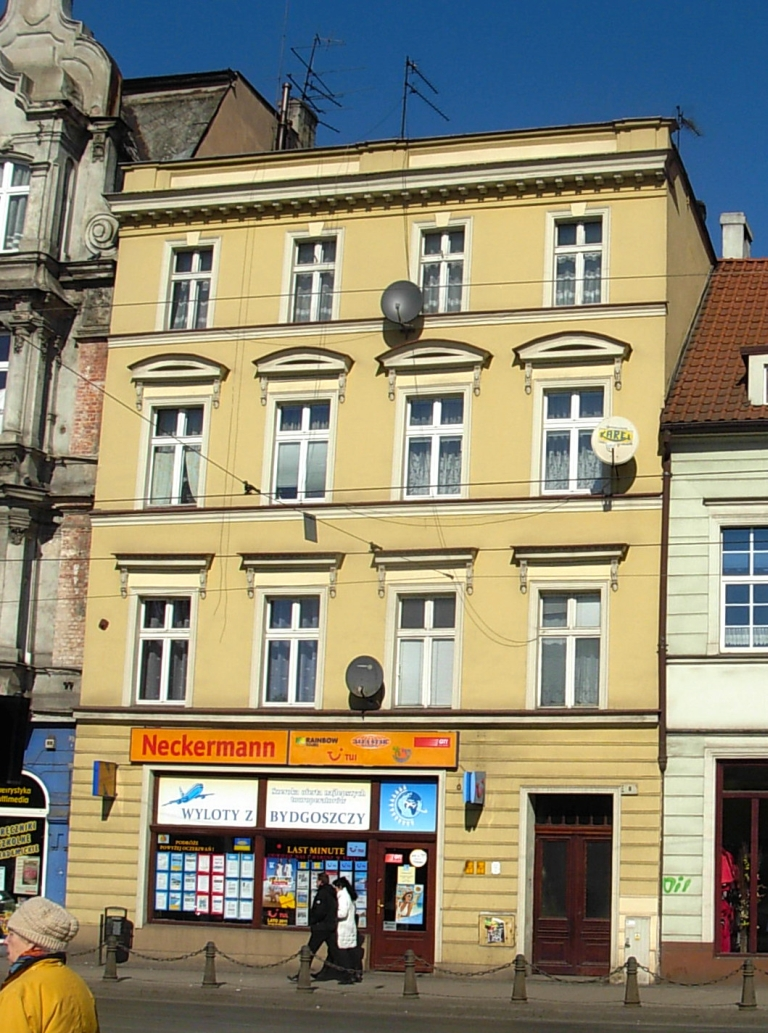
Elevation on the street

=== 10 Focha Street, on Theatre Square ===
ca 1900

Vienna Secession & Eclecticism

In 1880, Heinrich Castner, a restaurateur, opened a beer hall in this place. Franz Tomaszewski, a baker, owned this building, then located at Wilhelmstraße 14, from 1882 till World War I.

Main elevation bears profound features of Eclecticism with bay windows, adorned dormers on the gable. Decoration is very delicate, comprising arched pediments flanking a niche crowned by a cherub face on the first floor, a second niche is also present on the second floor. Everywhere, scrollworks with vegetal motifs are present, as well as adornment on dormers and bay windows.

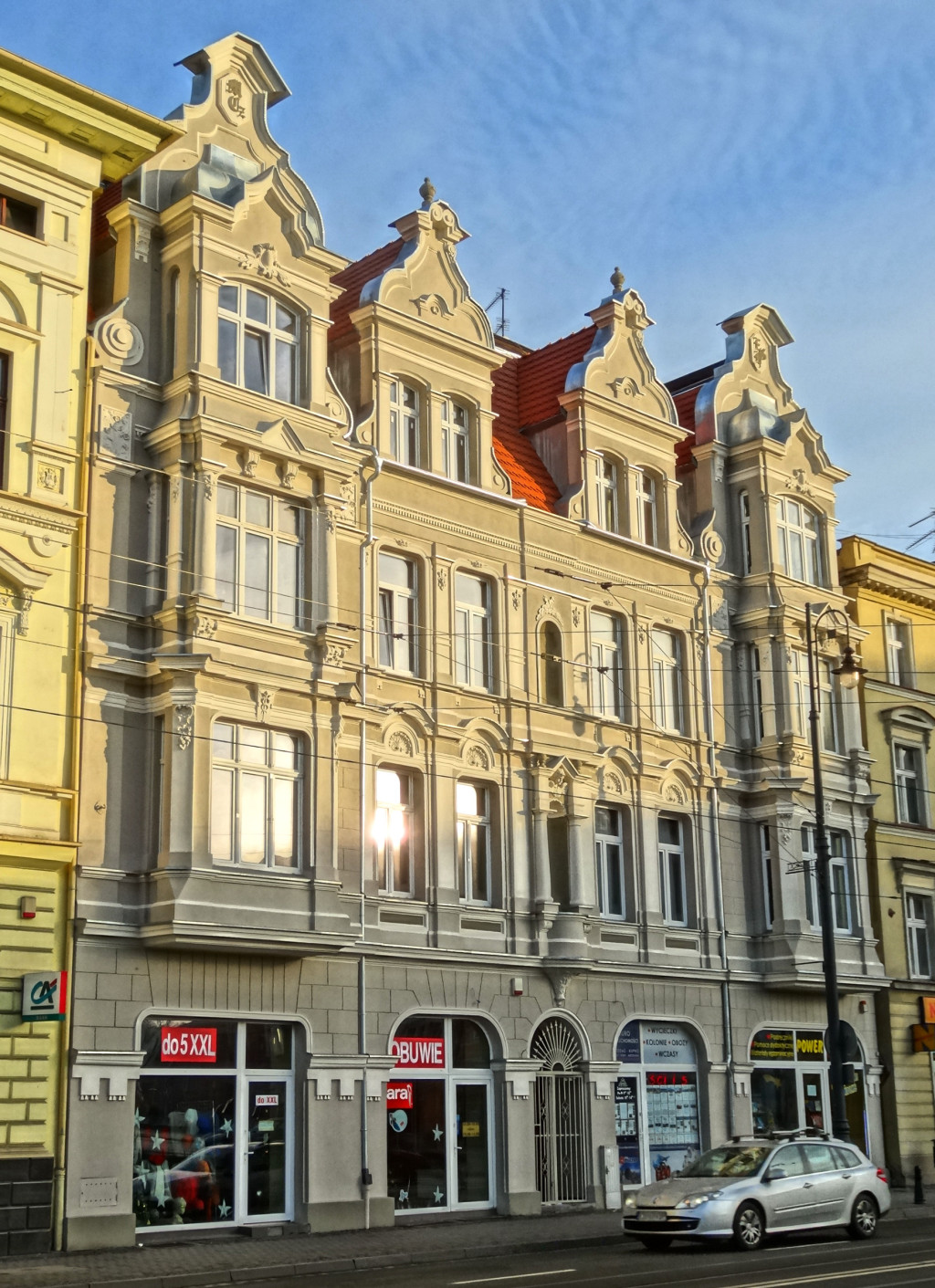
View from the street

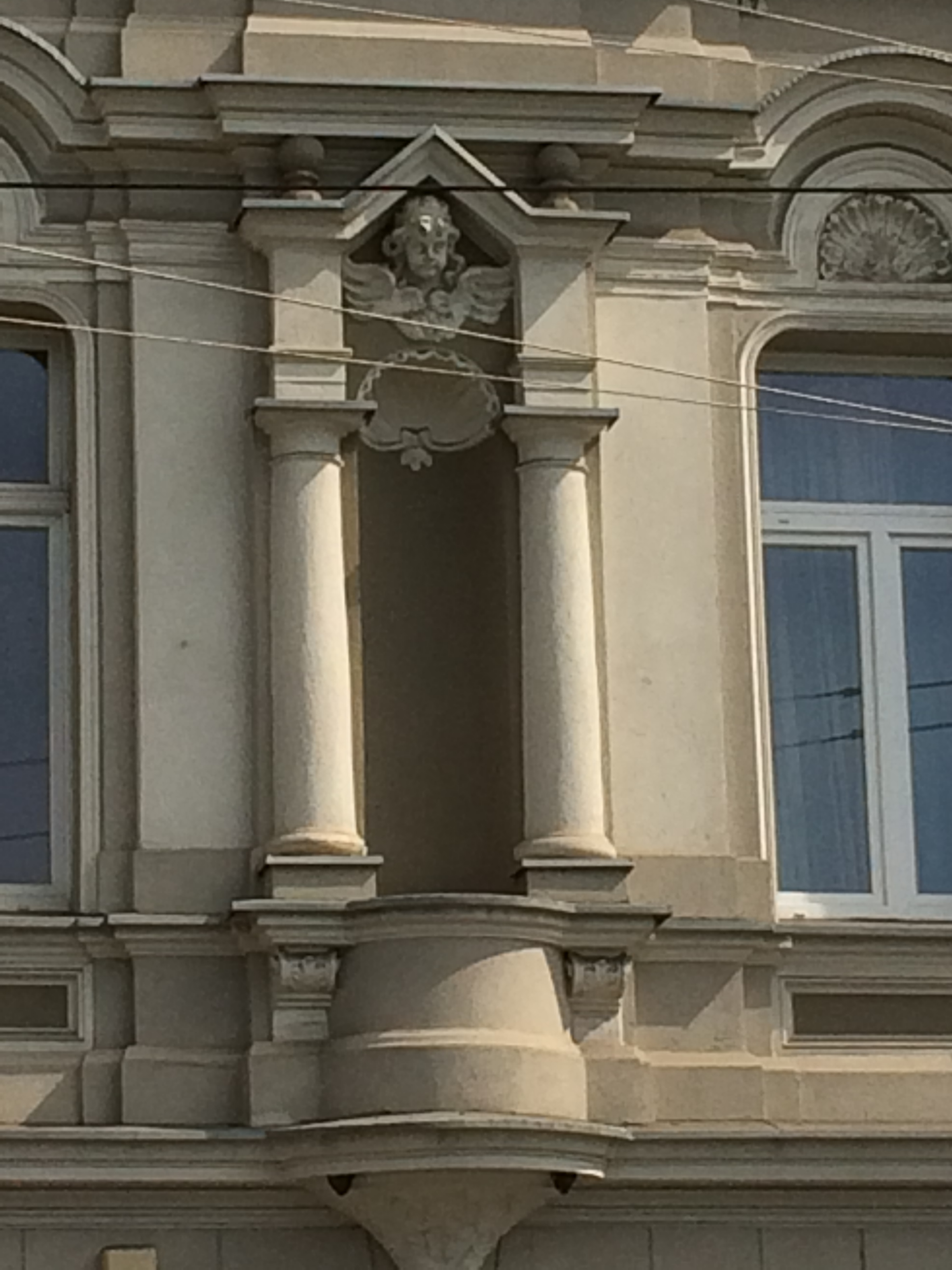
Niche detail

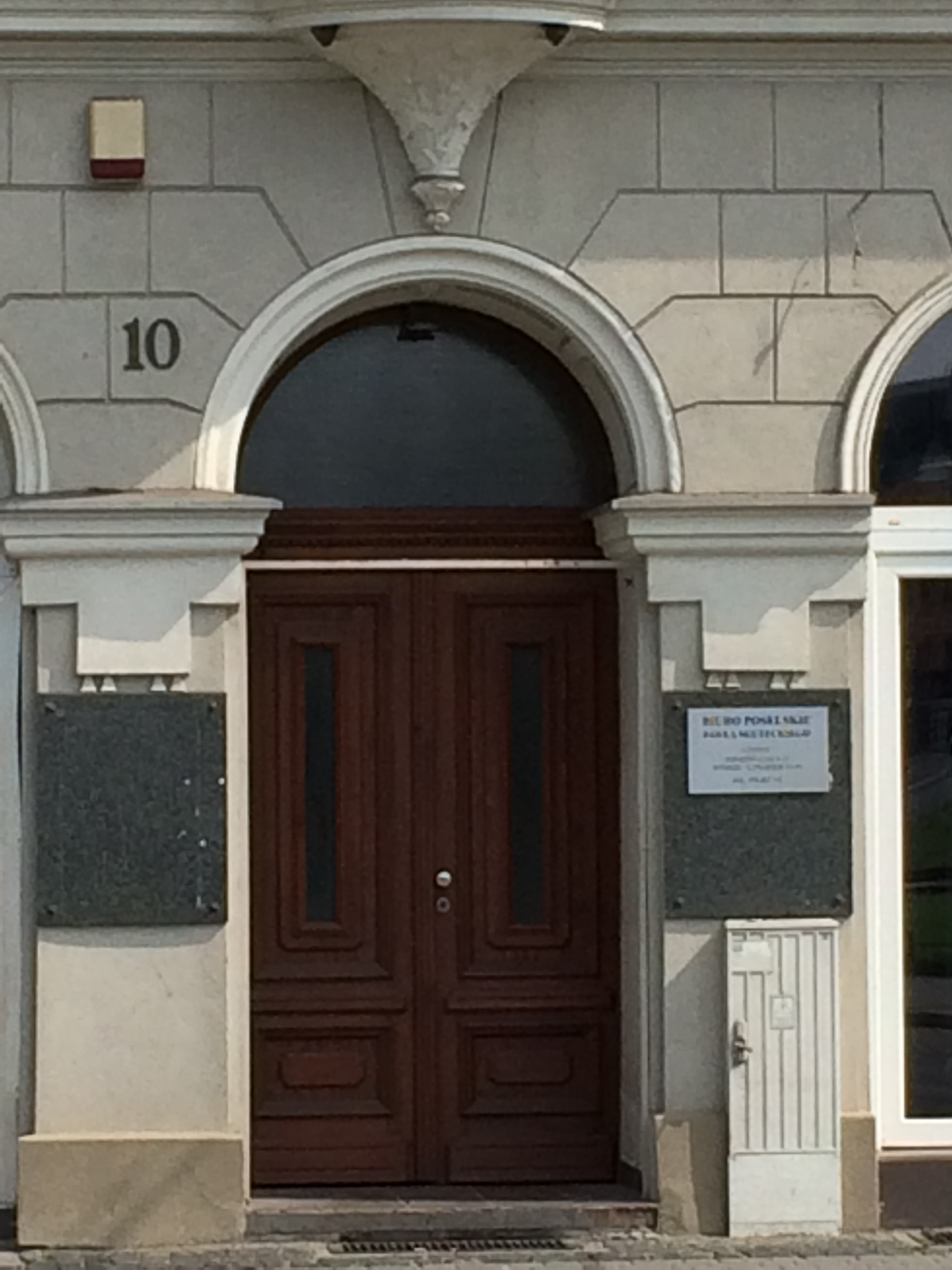
Main Gate

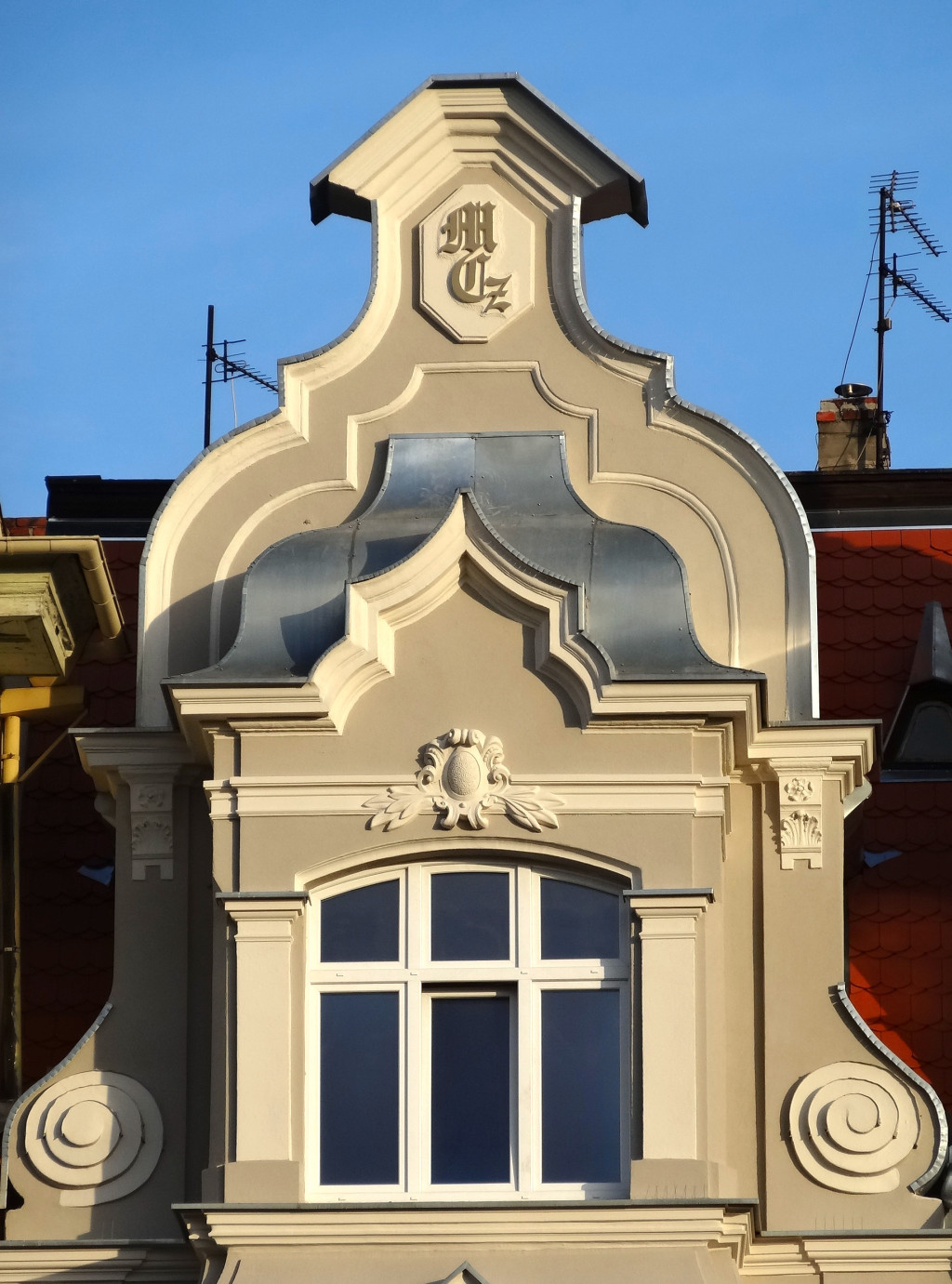
Detail of a dormer

=== 12 Focha Street, on Theatre Square ===
1879

Eclecticism & Neo-Renaissance

Otto Christian Ludwig Bollmann was the first owner this building in the 1880s, then located at Wilhelmstraße 13. He was a merchant, owner of a brickyard located in Ritterstraße (now Rycerska Street). Afterwards, the place housed a bank (Bromberger Bank) in the 1910s.

The facade has neo-renaissance features, with pediment bearing a bas-relief woman figure in a cartouche, hanged by vegetal garlands on the first floor. The most striking element is the grand bay window parting the frontage and towering the entry gate: it has almost classical characteristics with fake columns, triangular pediment and four allegoric bas-reliefs.

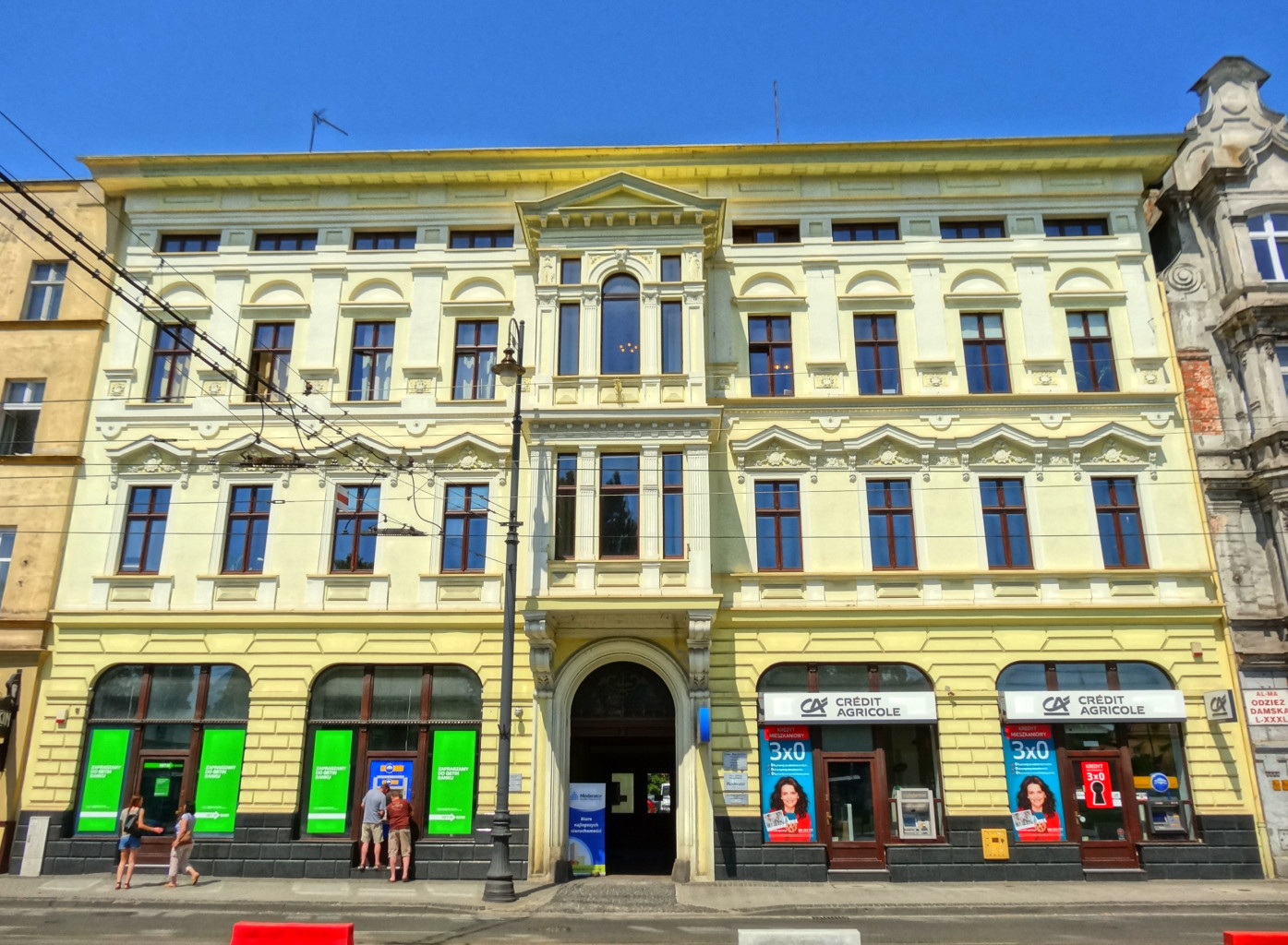
Main elevation

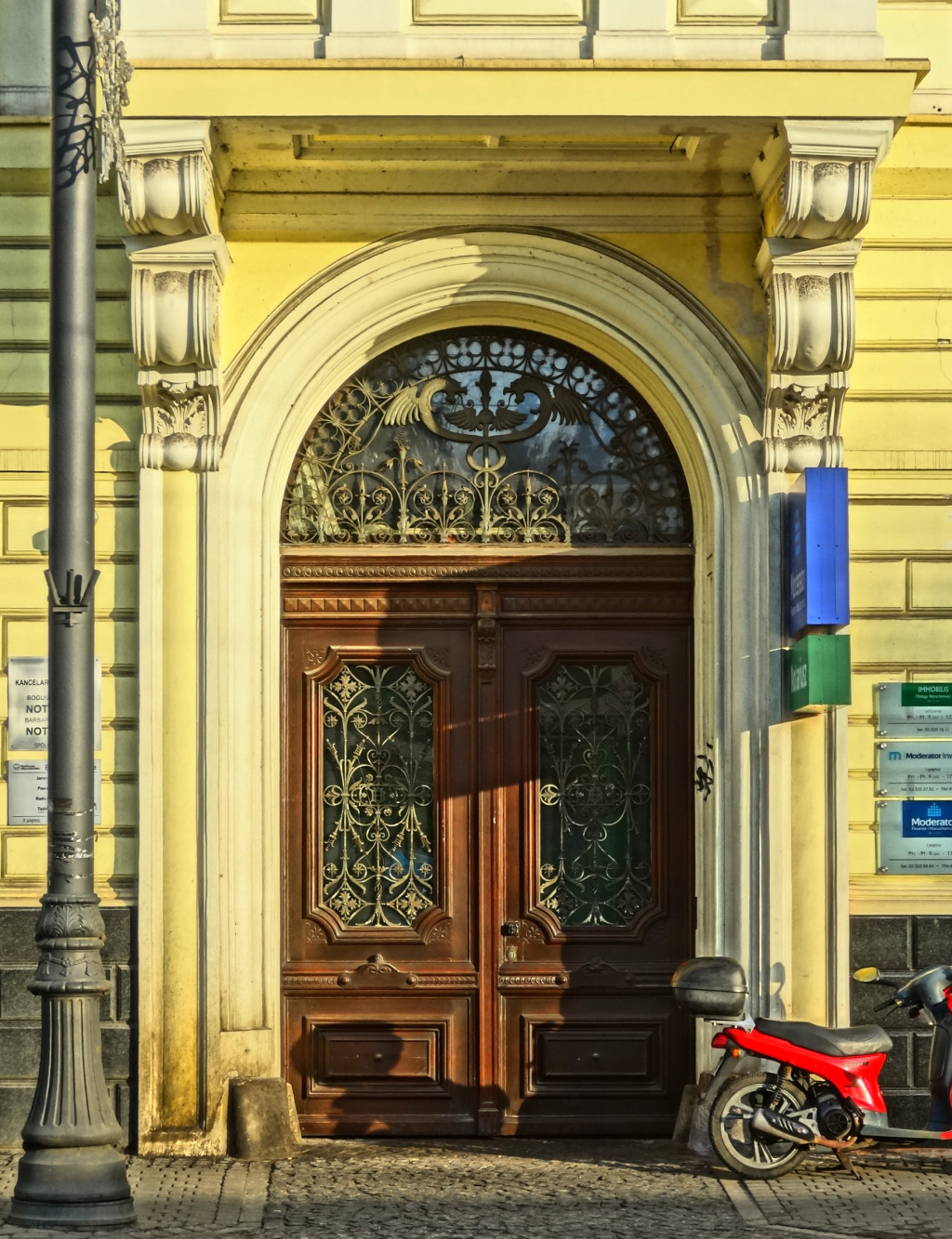
Detail of the gate

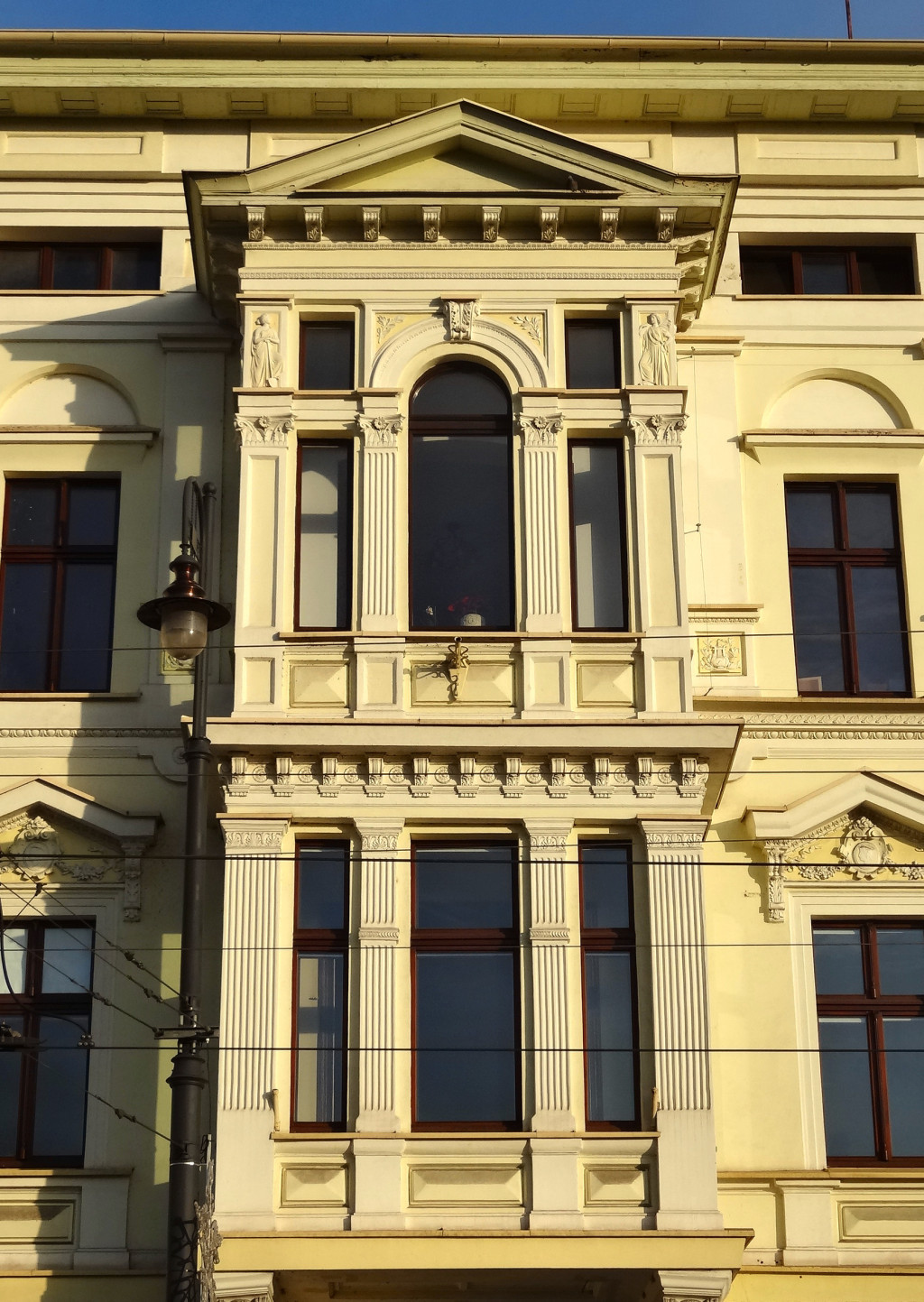
Detail of the bay window

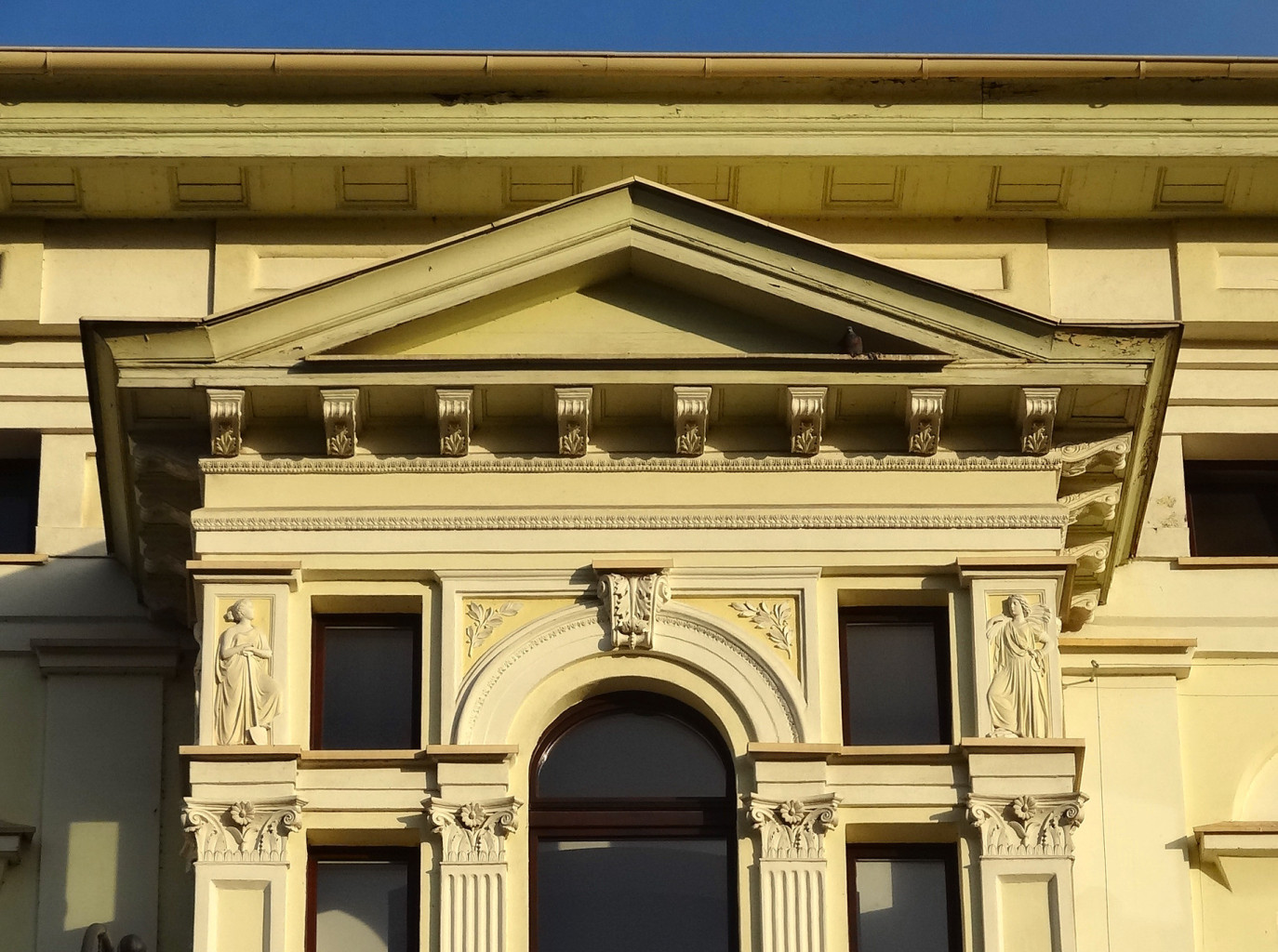
Pediment and two allegoric bas-reliefs

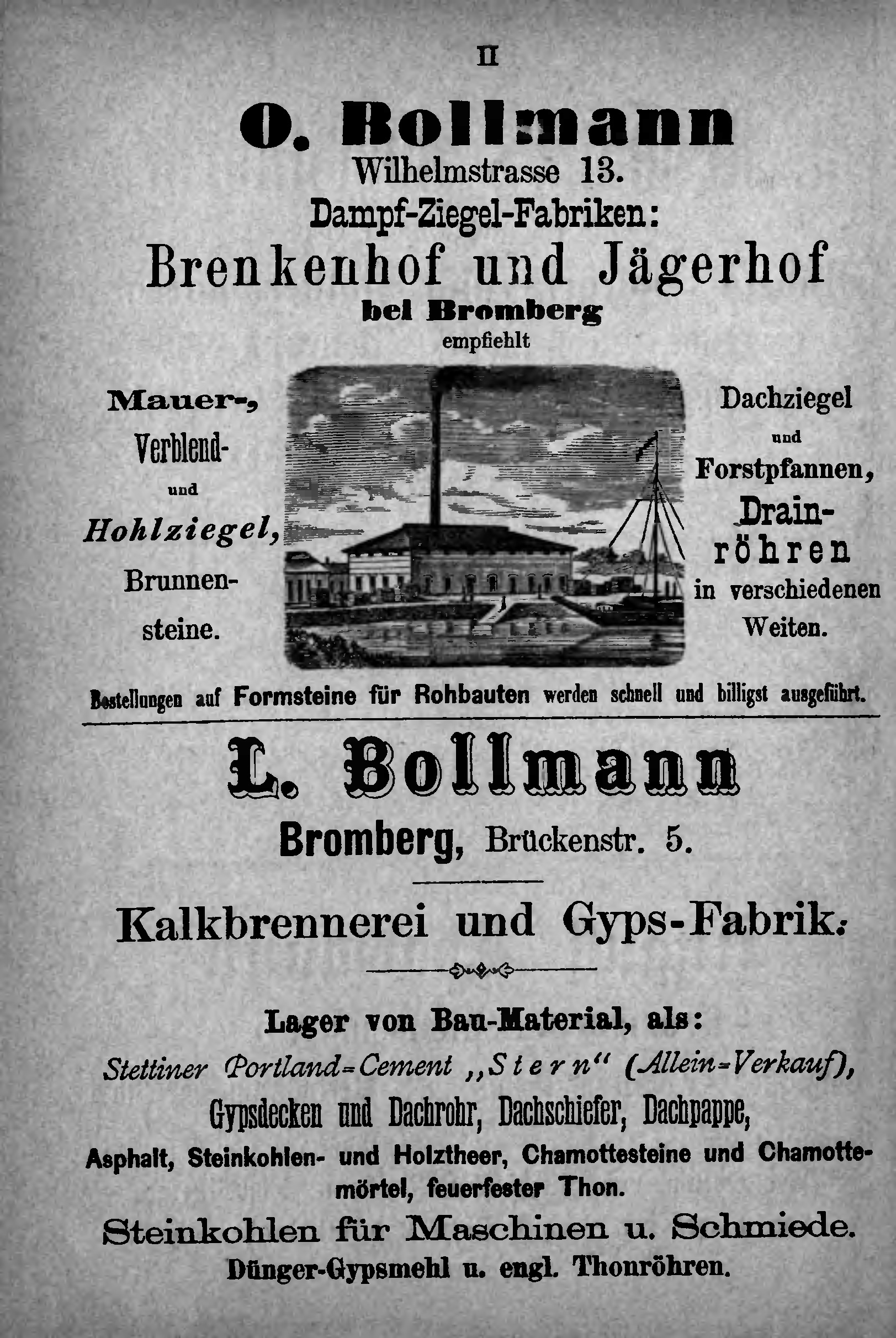
Advertising for Bollmann Firm in 1880

=== 14 Focha Street, on Theatre Square ===
1885, by A. Berndt

Neo-Renaissance

Albert Pallatsch, a restaurateur in Rinkauerstraße and Bahnhoffstraße in the 1900s, opened there a café-restaurant named Pilsener Hütte(1908), then Rheingold (1915). Initial address was Wilhelmstraße 12

The facade has lost all its decoration with time.

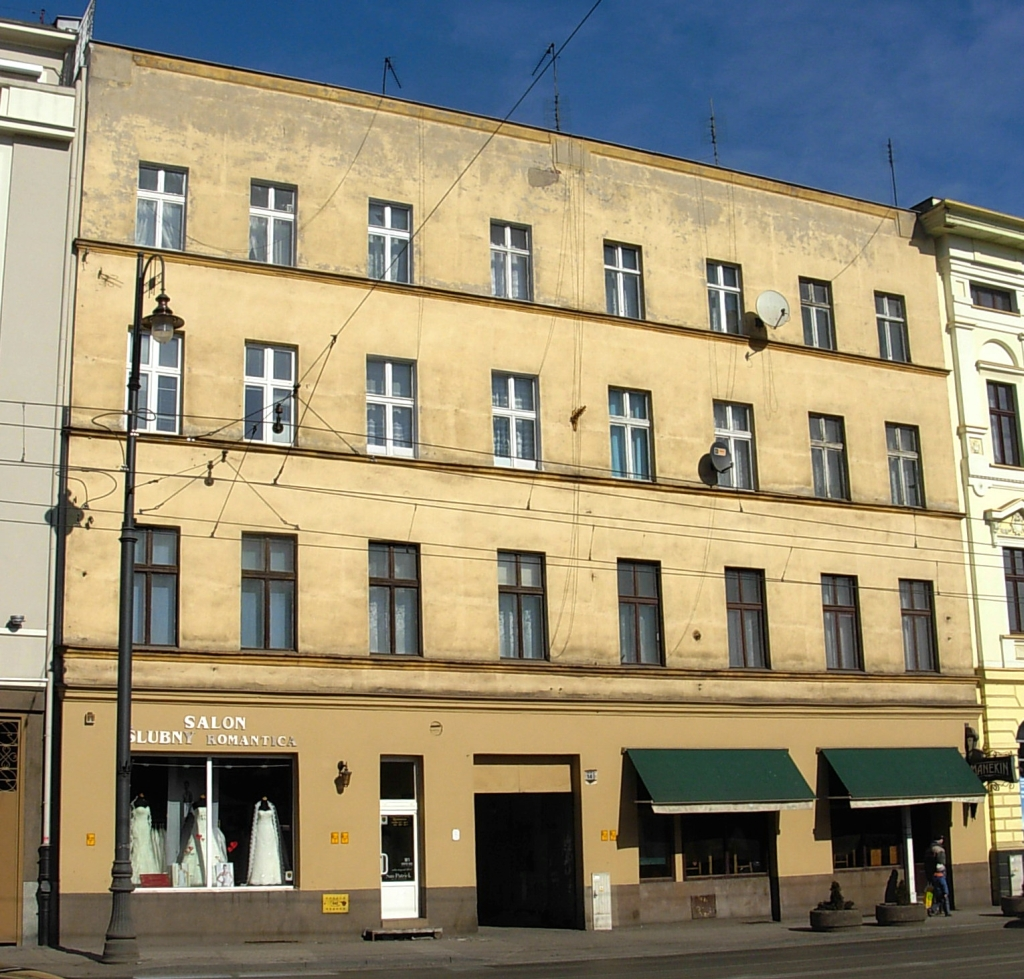
Main elevation

=== 16 Focha Street, on Theatre Square ===
1879

International Style

In this house lived in 1882, Anton Hoffmann, a master mason and architect very active in downtown Bydgoszcz during the second half of the 19th century. Part of his achievements are tenements or houses at Śniadecki Street 31, Pomorska Street 21 or Długa street 3. The actual building houses the company PS-SA (Polish: Polskie Sieci Elektroenergetyczne - Północ S.A.).

The facade has lost its decor following several refurbishments, only the top baluster railing has been preserved.

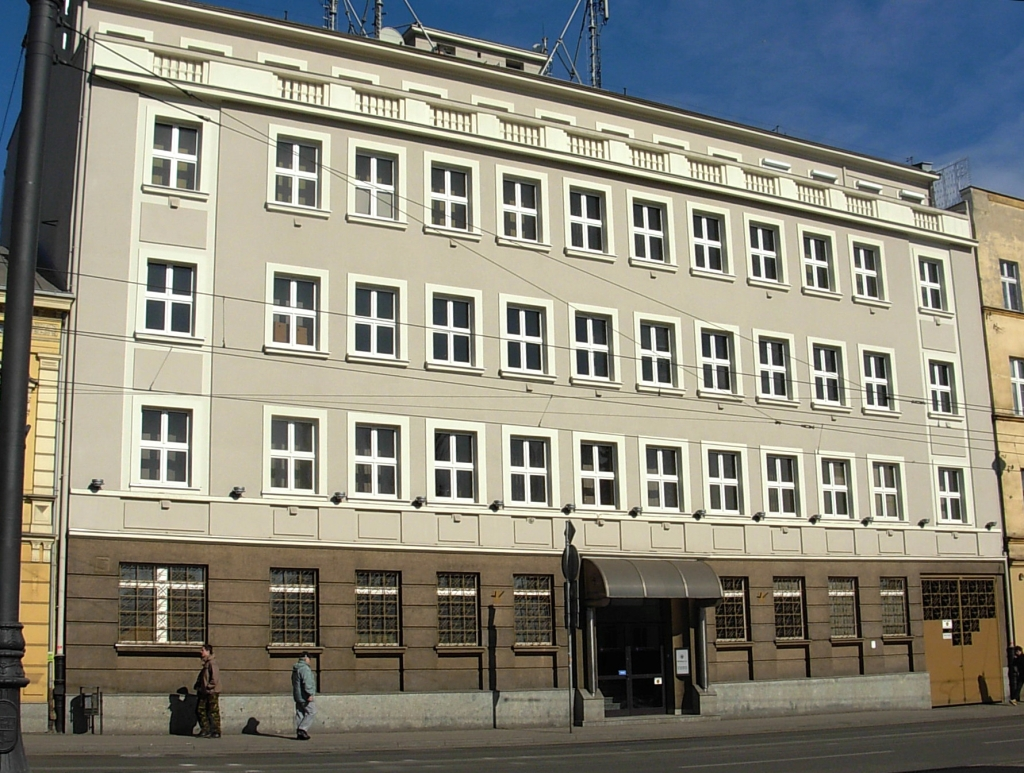
Main elevation

=== 18 Focha Street, on Theatre Square ===
1850-1875, by A. Berndt

Eclecticism & Neo-Renaissance

David Woythaler moved its tobacco factory to this location, then Wilhelmstraße 10, in the 1880s. In 1907, Bromberg plant was one of the largest manufacturers of snuff tobacco in Prussia. Once the factory closed in the early 1920s, the place became the National Printhouse T.A.(Polish: Drukarnia Narodowa T.A.). Brick buildings of the original factory are still preserved in the back of the plot.

Recently renovated, the facade displays an elegant balance, topped by a roof with parapet: pedimented windows are separated by adorned pilasters, a scrollwork frieze crowns the elevation.

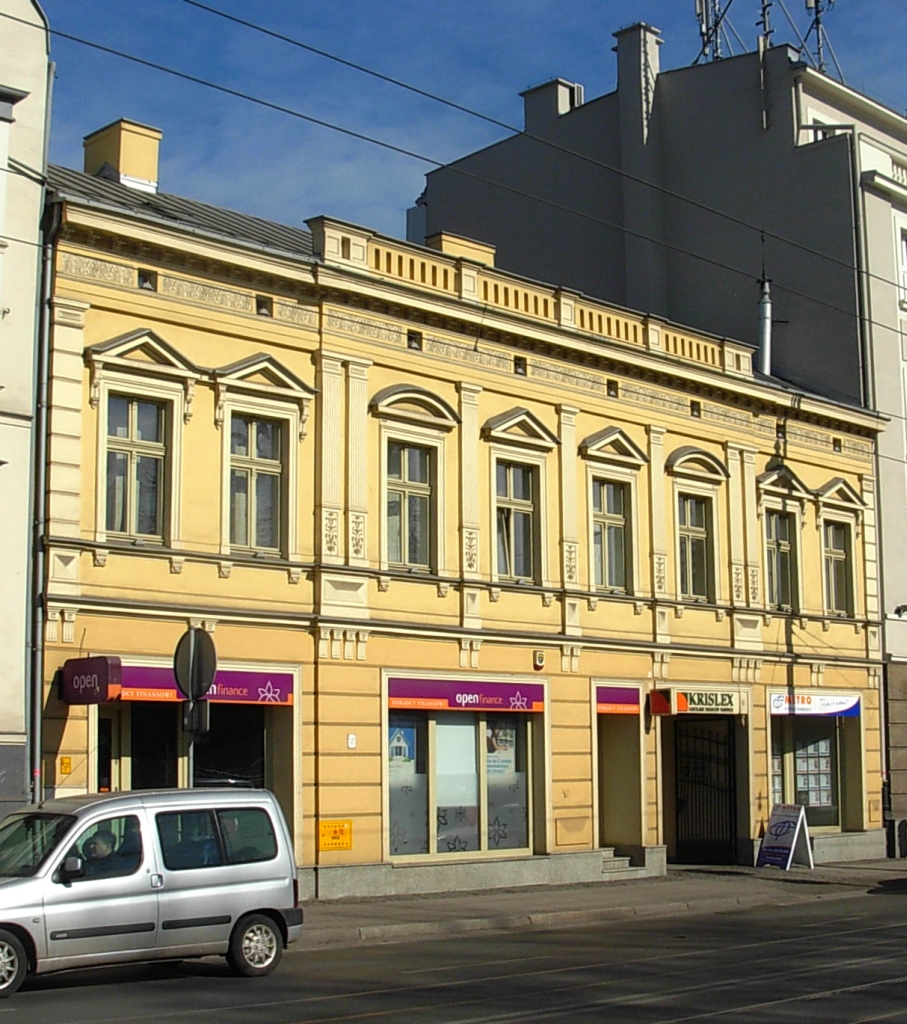

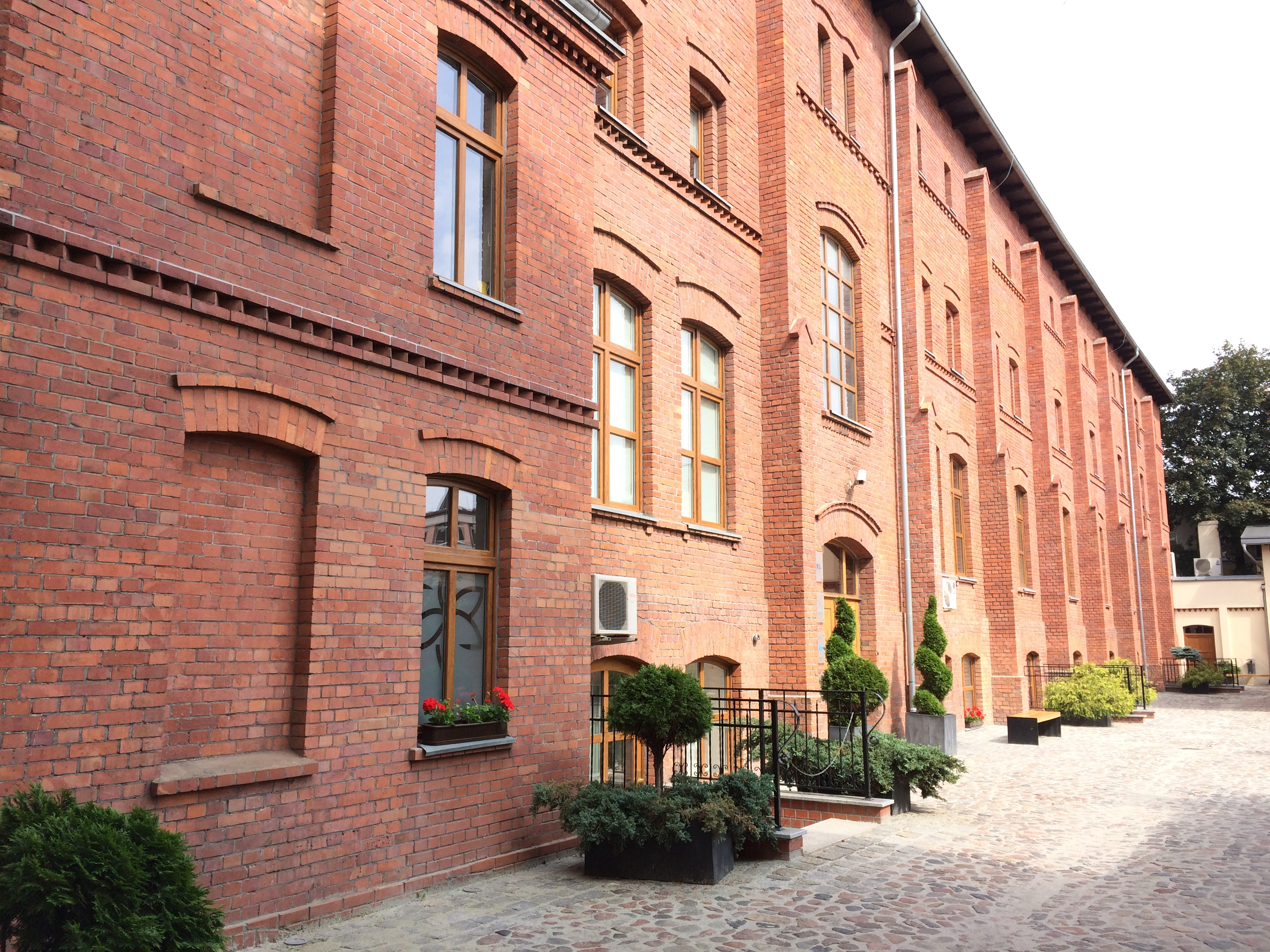
Backyard buildings

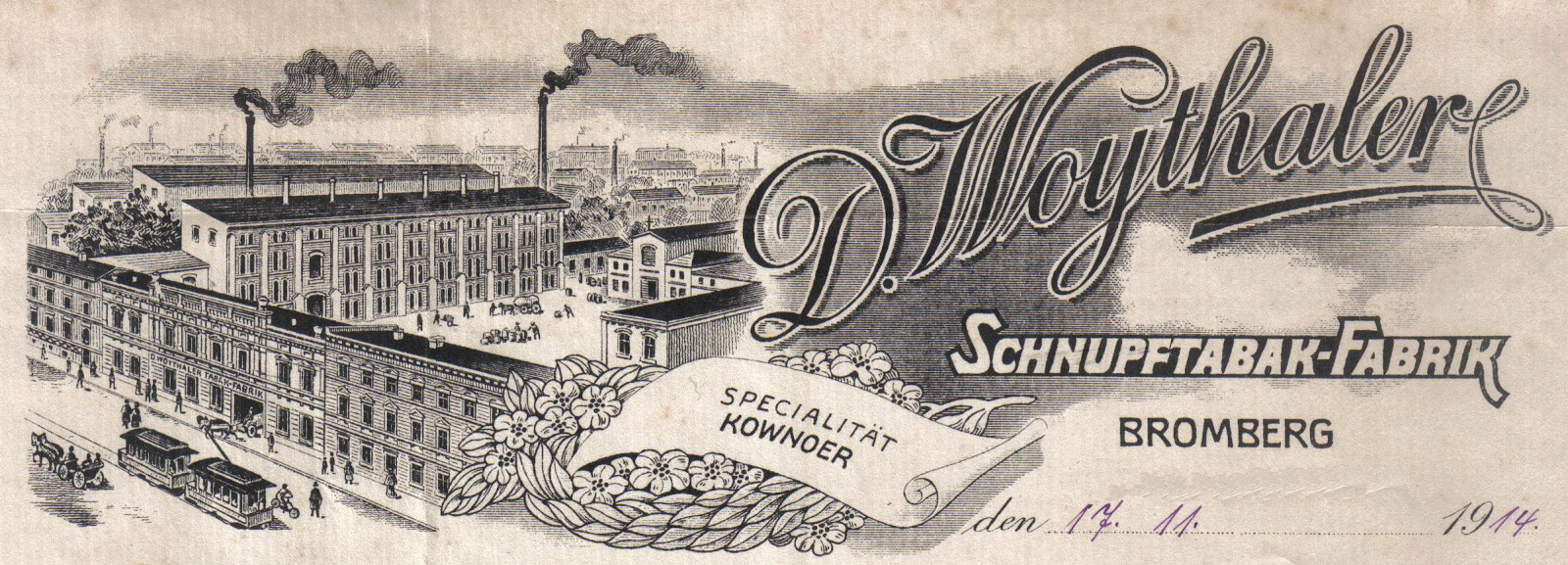
The tobacco factory on a 1914 invoice

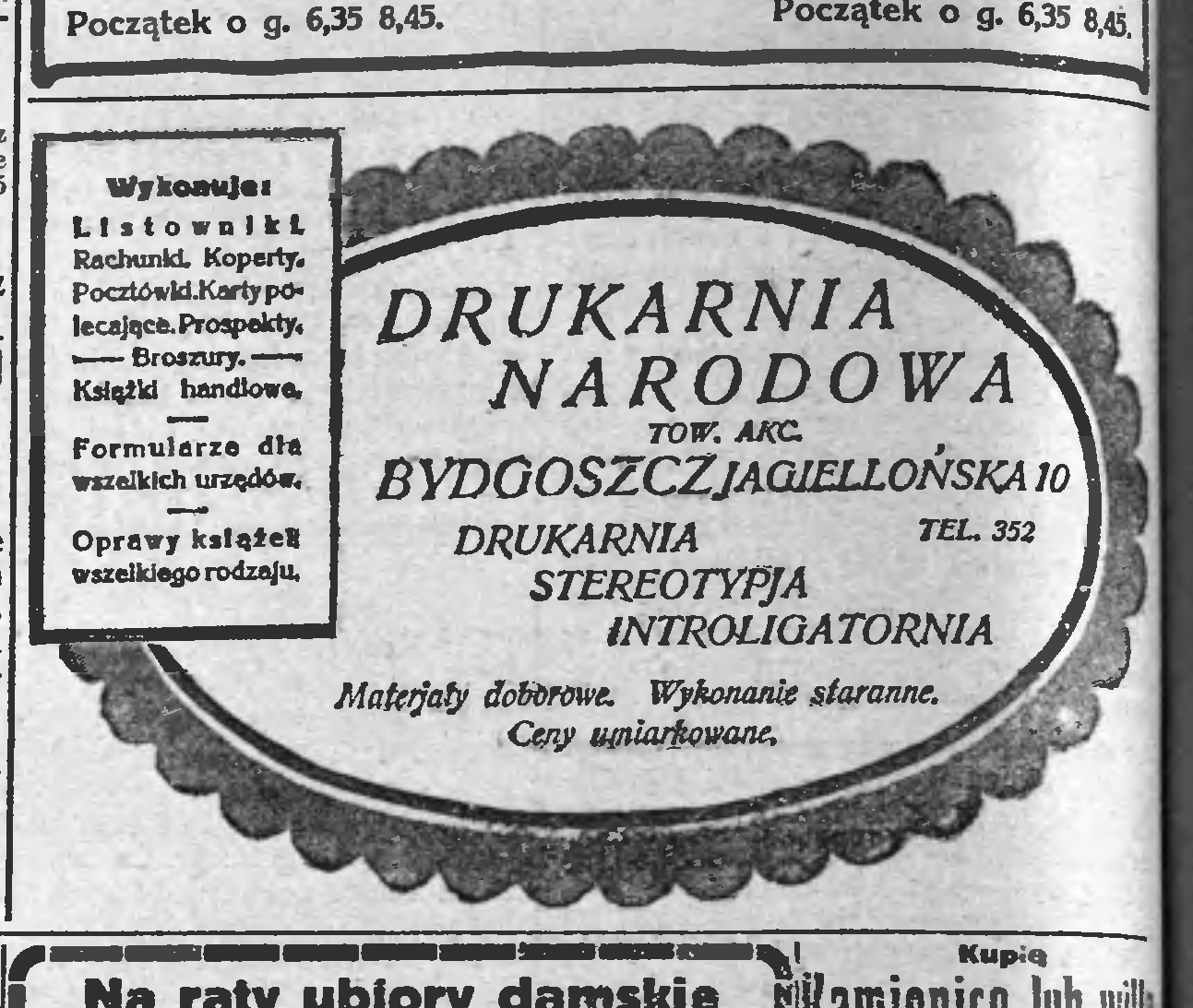
Advertising for Drukarnia Narodowa in 1923

=== 20 Focha Street, on Theatre Square ===
1850-1875

German Historicism

Johann Lindner, a rentier was the first owner of the building at Wilhelmstraße 9 in the late 1870s. The tenement has been renovated in 2007 and converted in 2014 into a four-star hotel Mercure Sepia (90 rooms) with a panoramic roof terrace (85 seats), parking (it opened officially on January 16, 2015).

The facade has a large bay window, but most worthy noticing is its roof: on a small area are displayed a hipped dormer window in the middle, a small tented roof on the left and a curve shape gable dormer on the left.

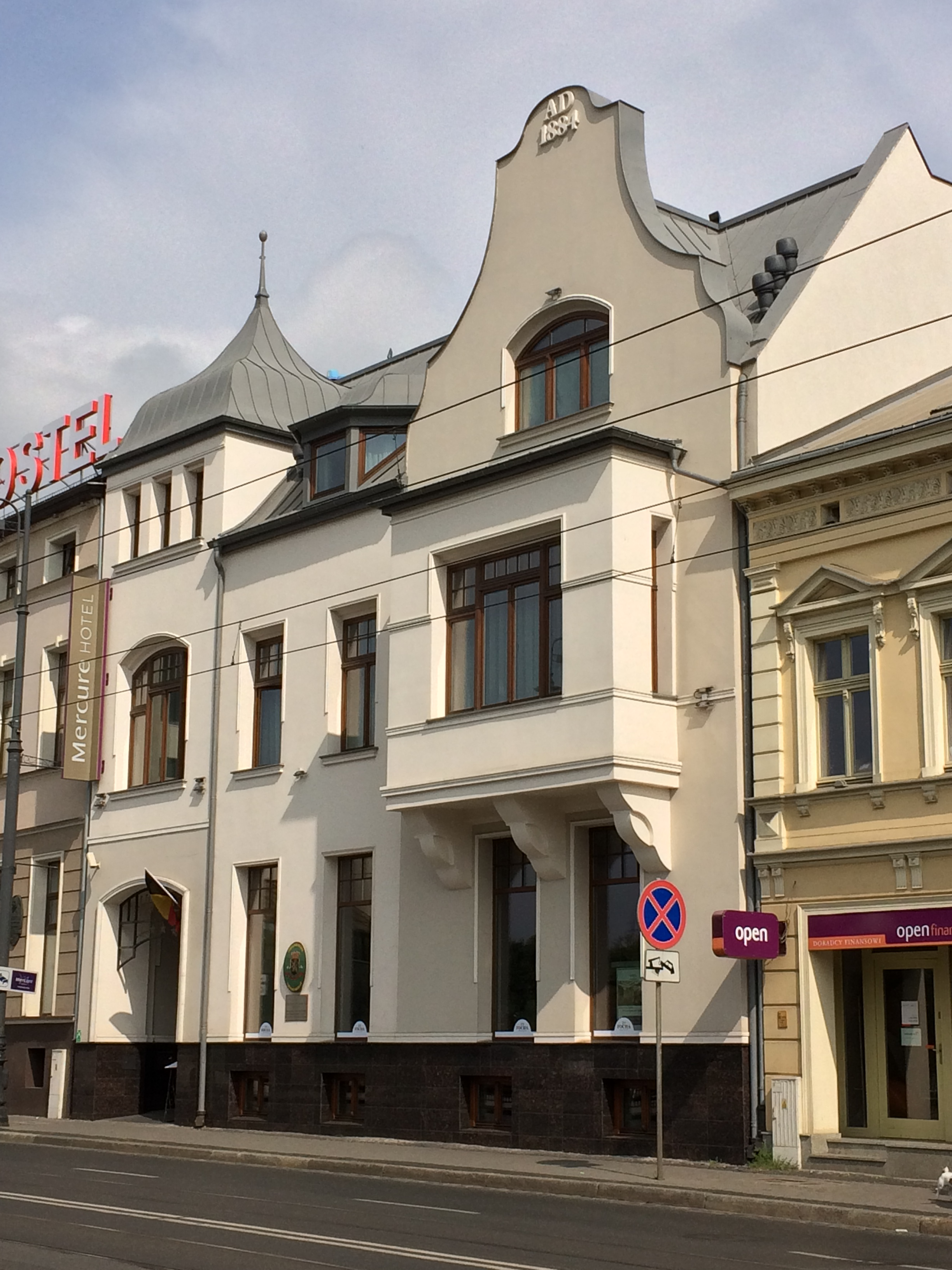
Main elevation

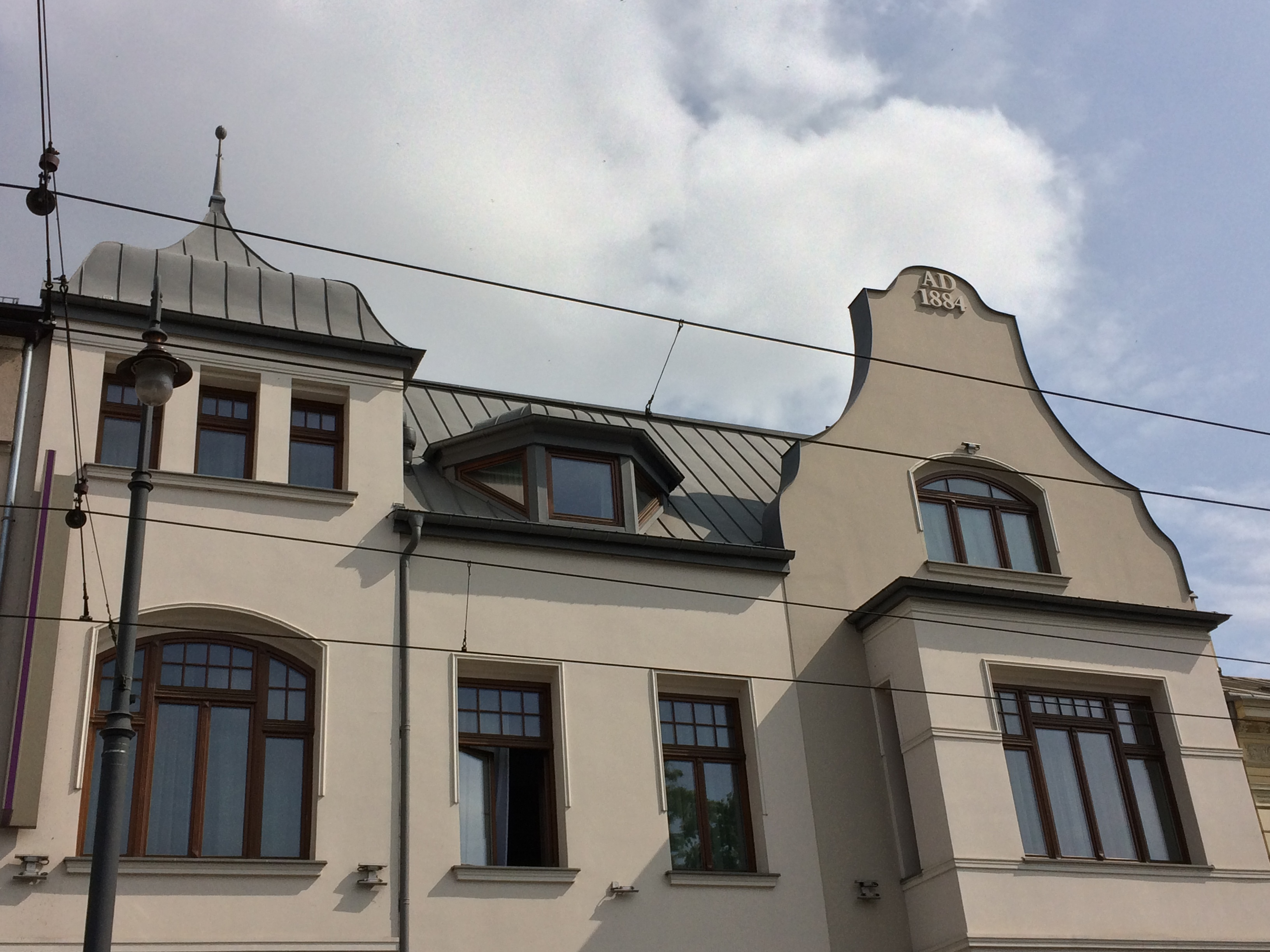
Detail of the gable

=== 22 Focha Street, on Theatre Square ===
1850-1875

International Style

J G Habermann, a merchant was the landlord of the original building at Wilhelmstraße 8 in 1864. The Habermans owned the house until 1895, when Władysław Piórek became the new landlord. Władysław Piórek (1852-1926) was a physician, national and social activist in the city, he supported Polish cultural, educational and charitable institutions. He has been made

=== Honorary citizen of Bydgoszcz (Polish: Honorowi obywatele Bydgoszczy) in 1926 ===
A dedicatory plaque has been placed on the building in 2000.

The facade has lost its decor in the 1990s.

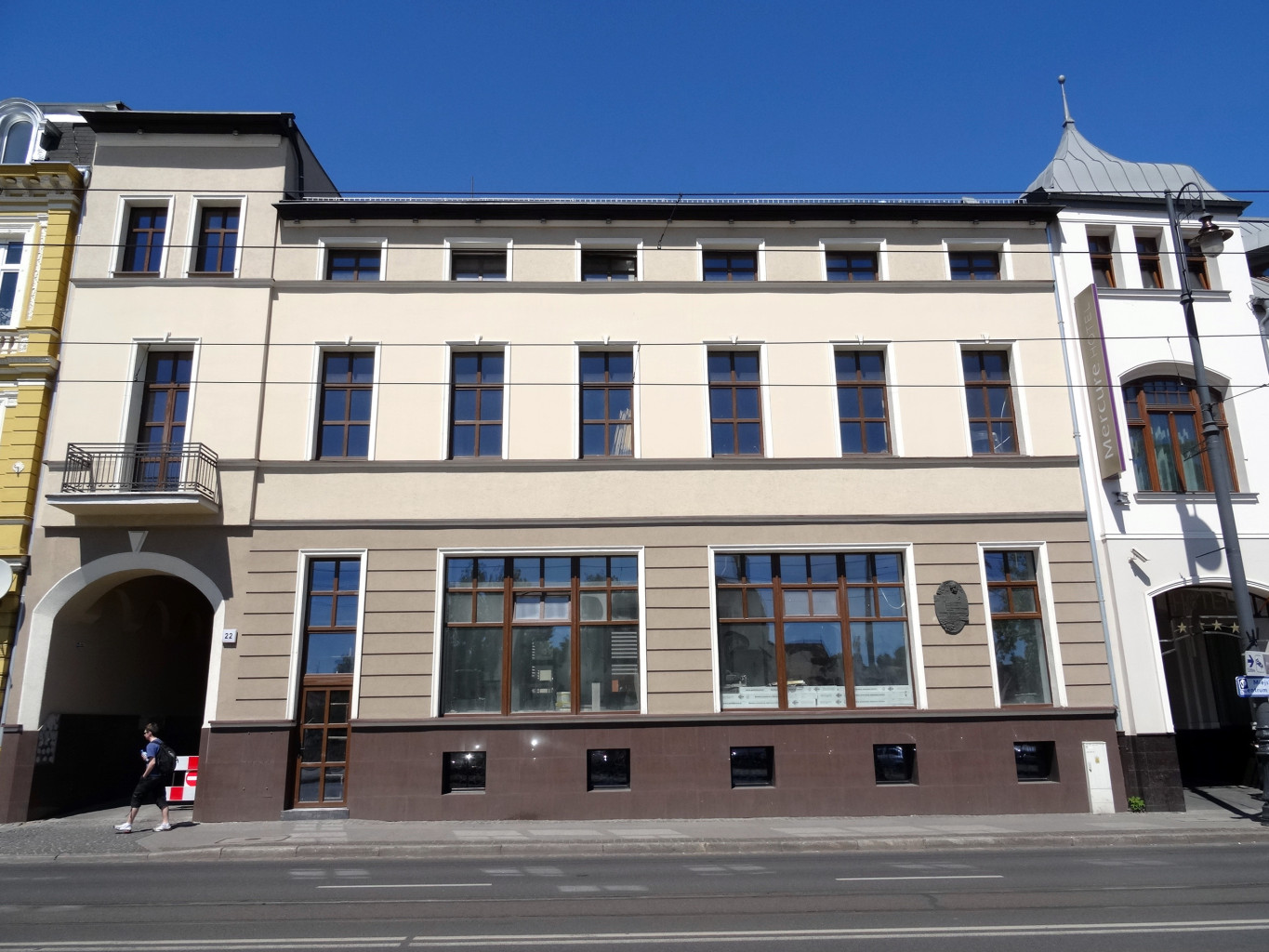
Main elevation

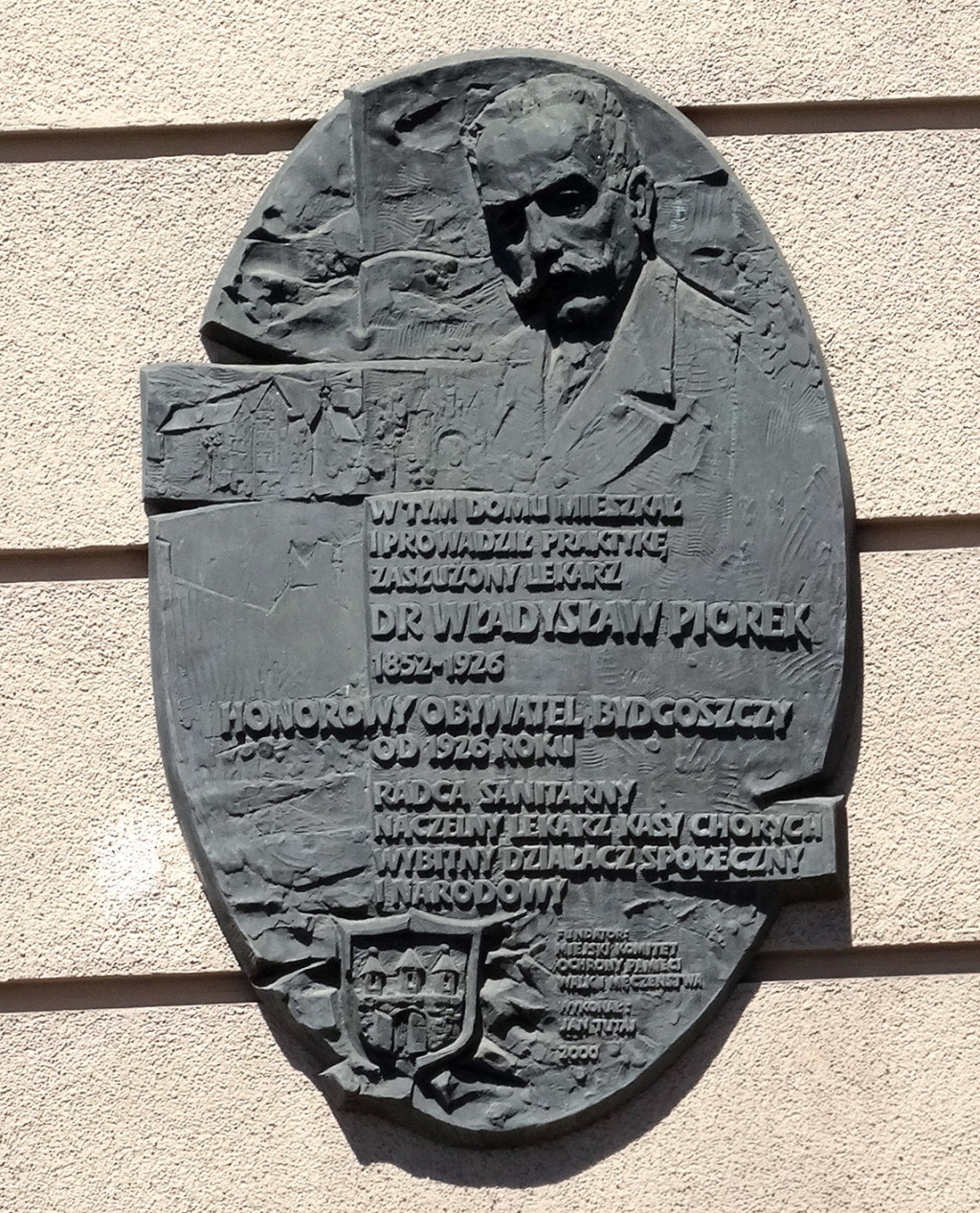
Plaque to Władysław Piórek
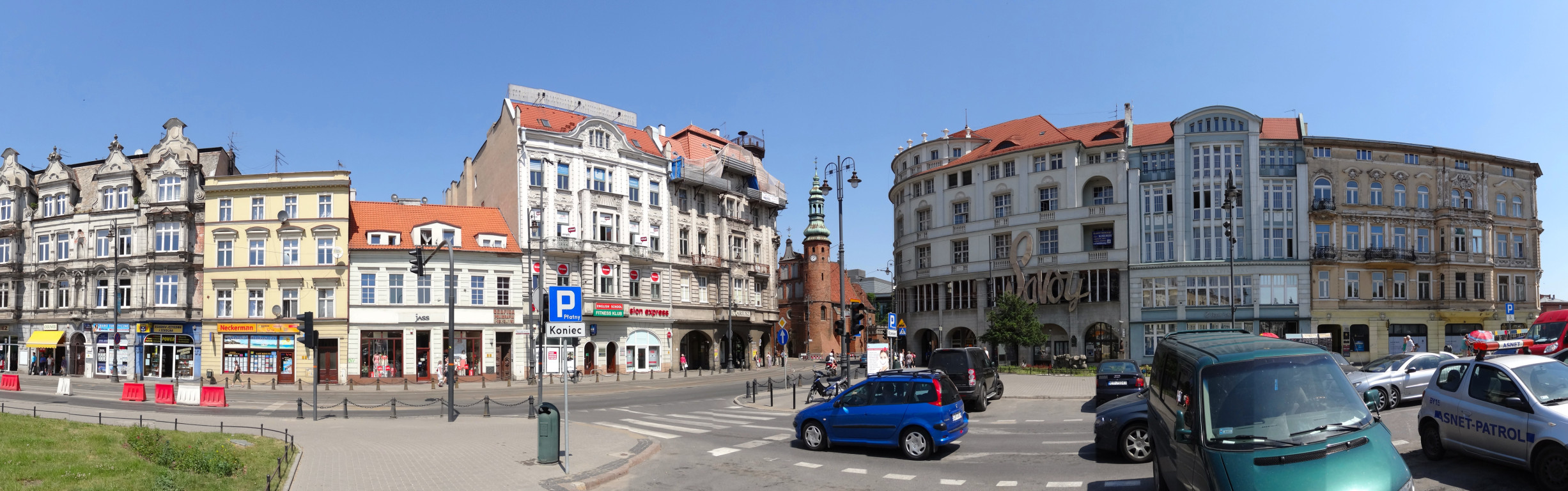
View on Northern and Eastern frontages of Theatre Square

== Miscellaneous ==
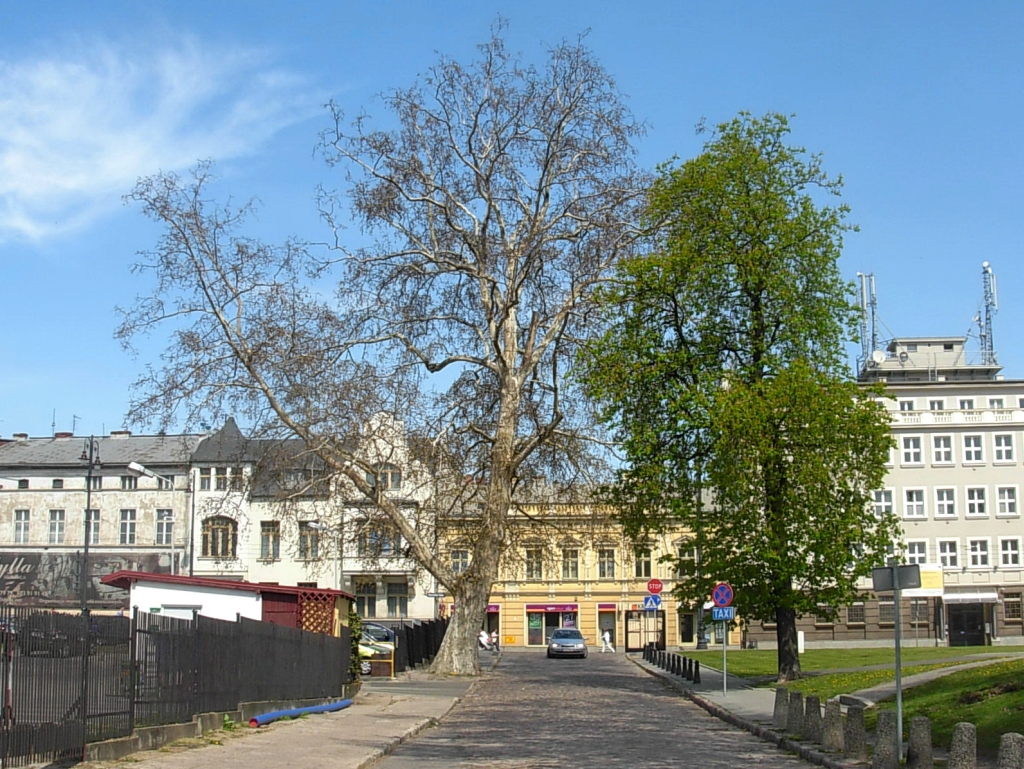
Polish Natural Monument London plane

In the western part of the Theatre Square grow specimens of trees and shrubs that are registered as Polish Natural Monuments:

- Four yews,
- A London plane with a 350 cm circumference trunk.

The 18° East Meridian runs through the Theatre Square.

== See also ==
- Bydgoszcz
- Fritz Weidner
- Józef Święcicki
- Former Municipal Theatre in Bydgoszcz

== Bibliography ==
- (in Polish) Czachorowski, Antoni (1997). Atlas historyczny miast polskich. Tom II Kujawy. Zeszyt 1. Bydgoszcz. Toruń: Uniwersytet Mikołaja Kopernika.
- (in Polish) Derenda, Jerzy (2006). Piękna stara Bydgoszcz, t. I z serii Bydgoszcz, miasto na Kujawach. Bydgoszcz: warzystwo Miłośników Miasta Bydgoszczy.
- (in Polish) Kaja, Renata (1995). Bydgoskie pomniki przyrody. Bydgoszcz: Instytut Wydawniczy "Świadectwo".
- (in Polish) Umiński, Janusz (1996). Bydgoszcz. Przewodnik. Bydgoszcz: Regionalny Oddział PTTK "Szlak Brdy".
