= Opera Nova =

Opera house in Bydgoszcz, Poland

- Polish: Opera Nova w Bydgoszczy
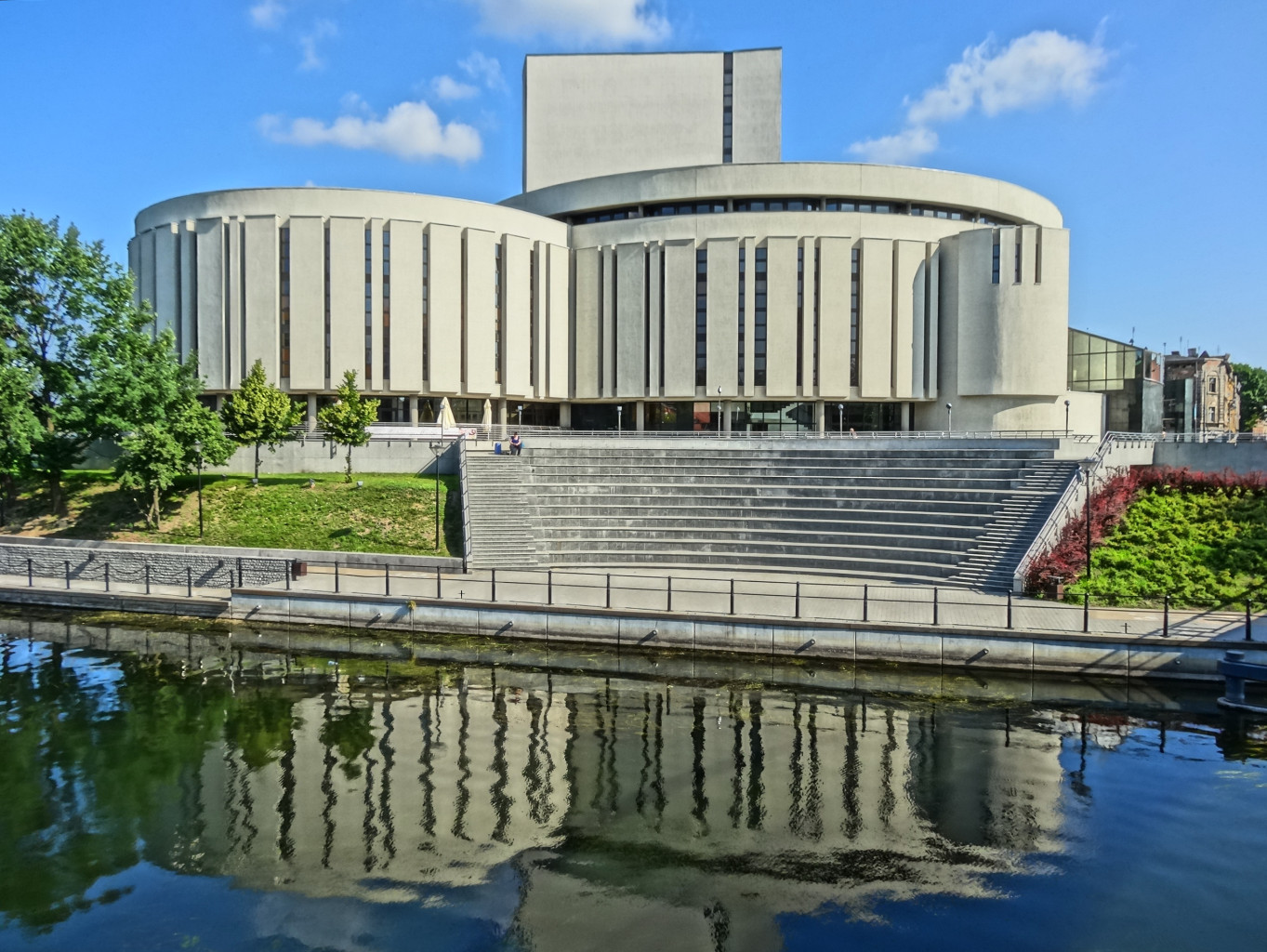
- Opera Nova from Mill Island in Bydgoszcz
- Interactive map of Opera Nova
- Address: 5 Focha Street
- Location: Bydgoszcz
- Coordinates: 53°07′28″N 17°59′51″E
- Owner: Ministry of Culture and National Heritage & Kuyavian-Pomeranian Voivodeship
- Capacity: 809 seats (auditorium)
- Type: Opera house
- Surface: 21202 m^{2}

Construction
- Opened: 21 October 2006
- Architects: Józef Chmiel, Andrzej Prusiewicz

Website
- http://www.operanova.bydgoszcz.pl

The Opera Nova is an opera house in Bydgoszcz, Poland. It was established in 1956, and it also plays the role of a musical theatre. It is one of the 10 opera houses in Poland and the only one of this size in the Kuyavian-Pomeranian Voivodeship. Opera Nova also welcomes the scene of the Bydgoszcz Buratino Puppet Theatre.

== Location ==
Opera Nova building is located in a bend of the Brda river between Old Town and Downtown Bydgoszcz. The opera House is connected with a footbridge over the Brda river to Mill Island (Polish: Wyspa Młyńska): from the surrounding terrace it overlooks Bydgoszcz Cathedral, and Mill Island's granaries and mills.

== Characteristics ==
Opera Nova is a cultural institution co-administrated by Polish Ministry of Culture and National Heritage & Kuyavian–Pomeranian Voivodeship. It realizes artistic activities comprising operas, operettas, ballets and musicals. Its activities also include educational projects, such as introducing opera and ballet to children. The Opera Nova company performs in Bydgoszcz, but also in other opera festivals in Poland and abroad. Since 1989, the ensemble has made numerous tours to Germany, Belgium, Netherlands, Malta and Italy.

Opera Nova extends its cultural influence out of Kuyavia–Pomerania, reaching audience and artists to neighboring provinces (Piła, Koszalin, Olsztyn).

The repertoire includes operettas, musicals, opera galas; it attracts a wide audience. The Opera Nova receives financial sponsorship from businesses in the area.

Maciej Figas is since 1992 the director of the Opera Nova, he is also the conductor of the opera orchestra.

In 2014 more than 82,000 people came to the Opera Nova.

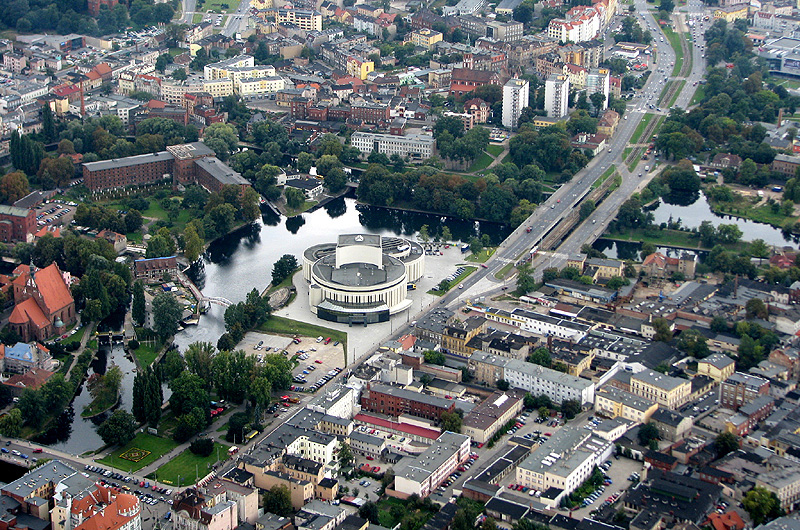
Bird eye view

== History ==
=== First times ===
The history of the theatre in Bydgoszcz dates back to the 17th century, when was built a special theatre hall in the city Jesuit College, able to accommodate approximately 300 people. In the 19th century, operas and operettas were played in the Prussian Municipal Theatre; from 1896 to 1920, opera companies from Gdańsk, Poznań or Rostock performed in Bydgoszcz. In the years 1920–1939, a cultural institution run by the German minority called Deutsche Bühne (German scene) was located in the backyard of 66/68 Gdanska. It was a professional theatre, which displayed opera ensembles and orchestra performances based on the local Bydgoszcz Conservatoire located at 9 Mickiewicz Alley. Its popularity matched Municipal Theatre. Deutsche Bühne staged operas, operettas, musicals and vaudeville, hosting German companies (Berlin, Hamburg, Königsberg). On 3 May 1930, to celebrate the 400th anniversary of Jan Kochanowski's birth, the theatre premiered "The Dismissal of the Greek Envoys" (Polish: Odprawa posłów greckich), as a tribute to the Polish community. After 1933, its repertoire followed the cultural Nazi propaganda diktats.

The first Polish opera in Bydgoszcz was founded in 1919. On 3 October 1921, members of Bydgoszcz Municipal Theatre presented the Polish national opera, Stanislaw Moniuszko's Halka. From 1921 to 1923, the Municipal Theatre organized summer opera seasons, with companies from Poznan and Warsaw opera houses. There were also recital singers with eminent artists from the world of Polish opera and operetta. Between 1923 and 1926, series of concerts in Bydgoszcz starred among others, Stanisław Gruszczyński, Ignacy Dygas, Jadwiga Dębicka, Victoria Kawecka. In 1926, the first recital of New York's Metropolitan Opera's bass Adamo Didur had a huge success in the city. The Municipal Theatre invited several times in the 1920s and 1930s Ada Sari for recital performances with piano.

For the season 1925/1926, an institution was created, the Pomeranian Opera Theatre of Bydgoszcz-Toruń-Grudziądz directed by Karol Benda. The company included a 36-musician orchestra, a 22-singer chorus, a small ballet and external individuals from Warsaw, Poznan and Lviv. In addition, operetta guests were outstanding Polish artists of the time (Matilda Lewińska-Polińska, Ignacy Dygas, Stanisław Gruszczyński, Jan Kiepura, Lucyna Messal). The Pomeranian Opera performed in the Municipal Theatre 15 premieres and 69 operas and operettas, such as Halka, Rigoletto, Tosca, Carmen, Madama Butterfly, Aida, Countess Maritza, The Gay Hussars, The Merry Widow.

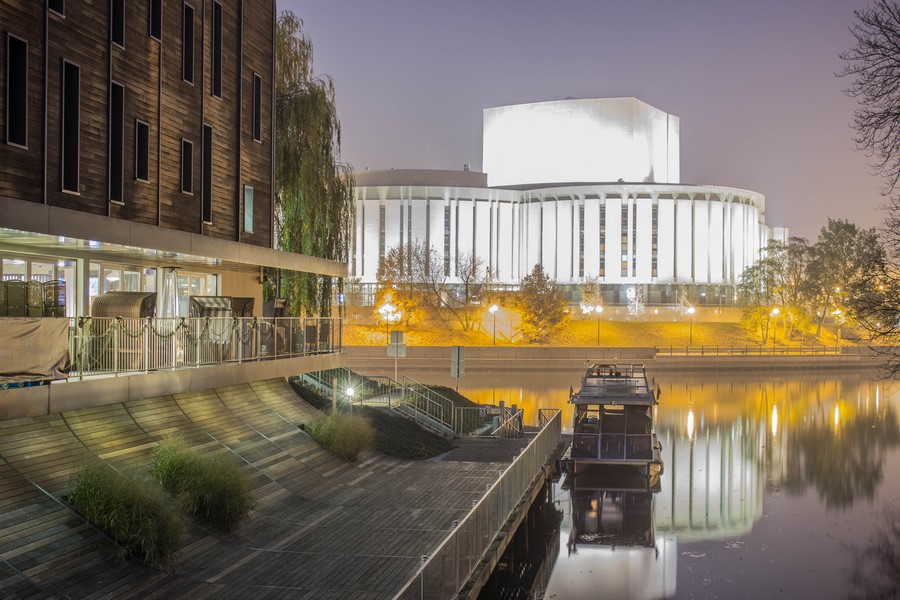
View from Mill Island marina

During 11 seasons (1927–1938), the director Wladyslaw Stoma enlarged the repertoire of operas and operettas performed in the Bydgoszcz Municipal Theatre. In many instances, new pieces from Berlin and the Vienna have been specially translated for the Bydgoszcz institution. Wladyslaw Stoma hired professional singers and the orchestra acquired military professionals from the 61st Infantry Regiment (Polish: 61 Pułk Piechoty (II RP)) billeted in Pomorska Street. In the 1930s, the theatre staged with its own company forces (soloists, orchestra, choirs) operas Halka, La Traviata (1930), The Tales of Hoffmann, Madama Butterfly (1931), Carmen (1932), in addition to host every year Warsaw Opera performances. The last musical premiere before the outbreak World War II was Susanna, on 4 April 1939. Throughout the interwar period, performances were staged in the Municipal Theatre: Bydgoszcz did not possess yet any opera house.

In German occupation times, the Municipal Theatre was intended "only for Germans" and manned by a German-Latvian troupe from Riga under the direction of Heinrich Voit. The inaugural session, on 1 October 1940, staged von Weber's opera Der Freischütz. The repertoire of the theatre until 1944 included several musical performances (opera, operetta, ballet evenings), and also Municipal Symphony Orchestra performances. In 1944, the German scene gave way to a decorated cinema building showing propaganda films.

After the end of World War II, efforts were made to create a permanent Opera facility in Bydgoszcz, but despite large popular audience, the initiative did not get approval from the authorities, which did not believed in the success of the project. To overcome the situation, opera sessions were held by the Pomeranian Symphony Orchestra, together with Bydgoszcz Choirs, to perform opera overtures, fragments of orchestral and choral opera.

=== Opera Studio ===
Opera Studio (Polish: Studio Operowe), created on 15 December 1955 at the initiative of the Music Society. "I. J. Paderewski", was the first step towards a professional opera theatre in Bydgoszcz. The initiator of the project was Felicia Krysiewicz, a singer, pianist and animator of musical life in Bydgoszcz.

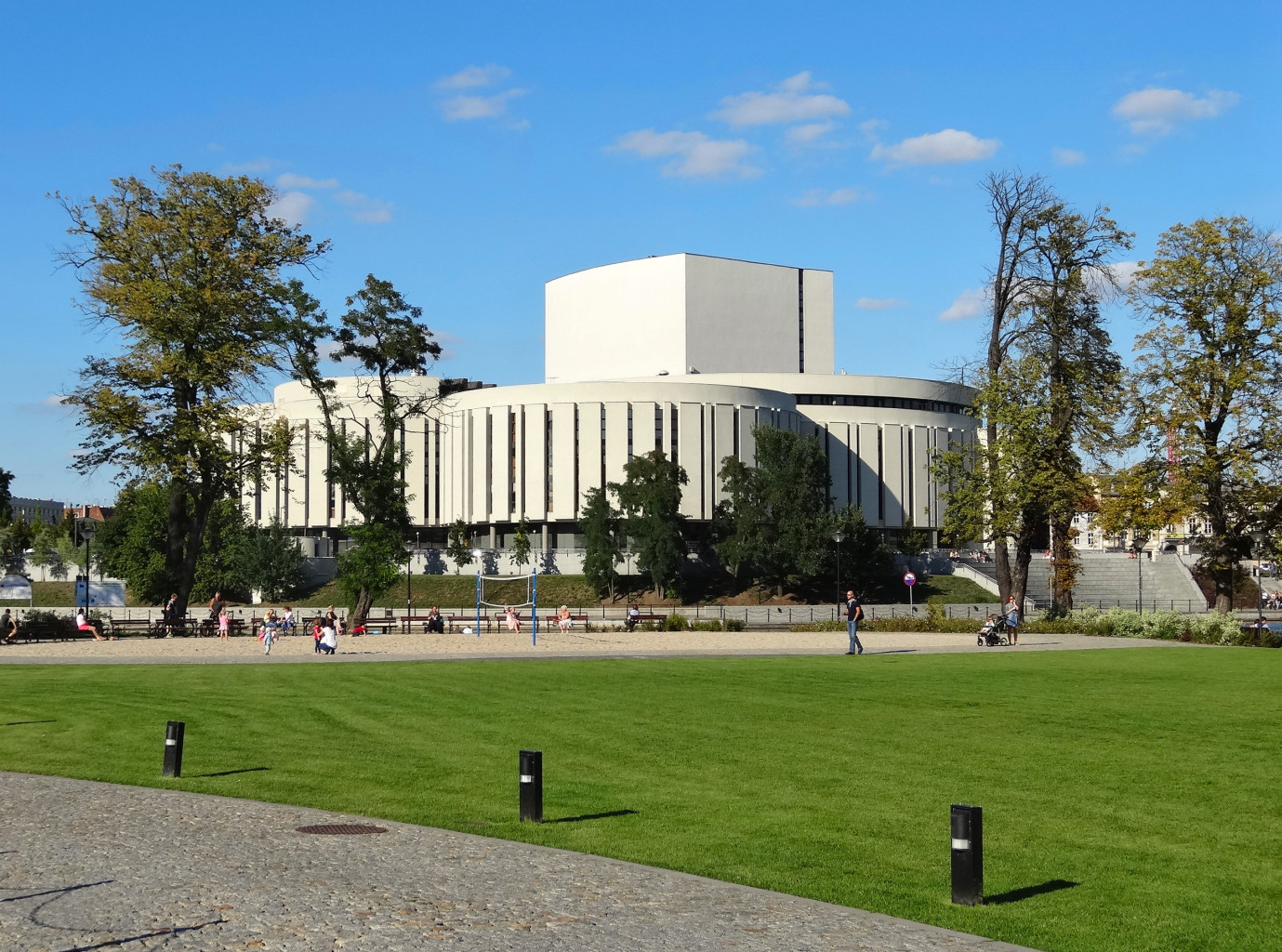
View from Mill Island

In January 1956, an agreement for a working structure was reached with the cooperation of Pomeranian Philharmonic, Arion choir in Bydgoszcz and the Social Music and Ballet department: orchestra was directed by Zdzislaw Wendyński, the choir by Antoni Rybka and the ballet by Raymond Sobiesiak. In May 1956, the Citizens' Committee for the Creation of Musical Theatre was established under the lead of Kazimierz Maludziński.

On 21 September 1956 the inauguration of the Opera Studio premiered Stanisław Moniuszko's Flis and Verbum nobile, and Karol Kurpiński's ballets The Marriage Fathers (Polish: Wesele w Ojcowie), with 150 people, including 20 solo-singers, 30 ballet dancers, 40 orchestra players and 60 chorus singers. In 1958 was created an institution called Bydgoszcz Comedy Music (Polish: Bydgoska Komedia Muzyczna) which aim was to perform in summer time operettas and musical pieces with tailored ensembles. Led by Józef Szurka, it had realized by the end of the 1980s around 1500 performances throughout the country, mainly in small towns.

Opera Studio repertoire gave the lion's share to comic opera and operetta classics. Performances were held in the building of the Polish Theatre in Mickiewicz Alley, in various clubs and occasionally in the hall of the Pomeranian House of Art. During its four-year activity, Opera Studio gave 10 premieres and around 400 performances, including 34 outside Bydgoszcz (Toruń, Grudziądz, Inowrocław, Świecie) which attracted an audience of 22 000. In 1958, thanks to minister credits, full-time soloists were engaged, as well as half-time choir, ballet and administration individuals. On 10 April 1958 the first ballet was performed, The Nutcracker by Tchaikovsky, and on 2 July Offenbach's operetta Orpheus in the Underworld. Opera Studio was renamed on 3 March 1959, Musical Theatre of Opera and Operetta (Polish: Teatr Muzyczny Opery i Operetki), so as to meet cultural expectations of the inhabitants of the entire Bydgoszcz Voivodeship. A year later, on 1 March 1960, the institution was nationalized. In 1963, the Musical Theatre of Opera and Operetta had then its own orchestra established, putting an end to the use of musicians from the Pomeranian Philharmonic.

=== State Opera and Operetta in Bydgoszcz ===
Bydgoszcz musical scene, once nationalised, changed its name several times: Opera and Operetta (1964), National Opera (1980), Opera Nova (1990), and from 1996, Opera Nova – State Opera in Bydgoszcz. Until the mid-1990s, the institution did not have its own facility: it used the Pomeranian Art House building and three times a week staged in Polish Theatre in Bydgoszcz. In spite of these unusual conditions, the company gained there its first experience and several artists who started here, appeared later on national stages in Warsaw, Łódź and Poznań: Barbara Zagórzanka (soprano), Lidia Skowron, Bożena Kinasz-Mikołajczak, Bożena Betley, Elżbieta Hoffmann, Monika Olkisz-Chabros (soprano) Henryk Kłosiński (tenor), Bronisław Pekowski (bass-baritone), and others. Besides, the troupe hosted the greatest opera artists: Maria Foltyn (1960), Antonina Kawecka (1962), Bogna Sokorska (1960), Krystyna Szczepańska (1964), Teresa Żylis-Gara (1959), Wiesław Ochman (1965), Bernard Ładysz (1960), Bogdan Paprocki (1962), Ryszard Tarasiewicz (1970) Marcin Bronikowski (1994, 2012). The Bydgoszcz opera executed works by contemporary composers, who had their world premieres: musicals Hel of Jerzy Lawiny-Świętochowski and Ryszard Damrosz (1965), opera Przemysław II by Henryk Swolkień (1986), ballets Anna Karenina by Radion Shchedrin (1979), Bernadett Matuszczak's Wild swans (1992) and Bogdan Pawlowski's Puss in boots (1997). Many companies from East and West countries came to Bydgoszcz stage and Opera Nova ensembles toured abroad, mainly to Western Europe (France, Germany, Italy, Malta, Netherlands, Belgium, Austria, Switzerland, Luxembourg), performing at numerous opera festivals. These foreign contacts resulted in an enhanced cooperation with opera music centers in Europe.

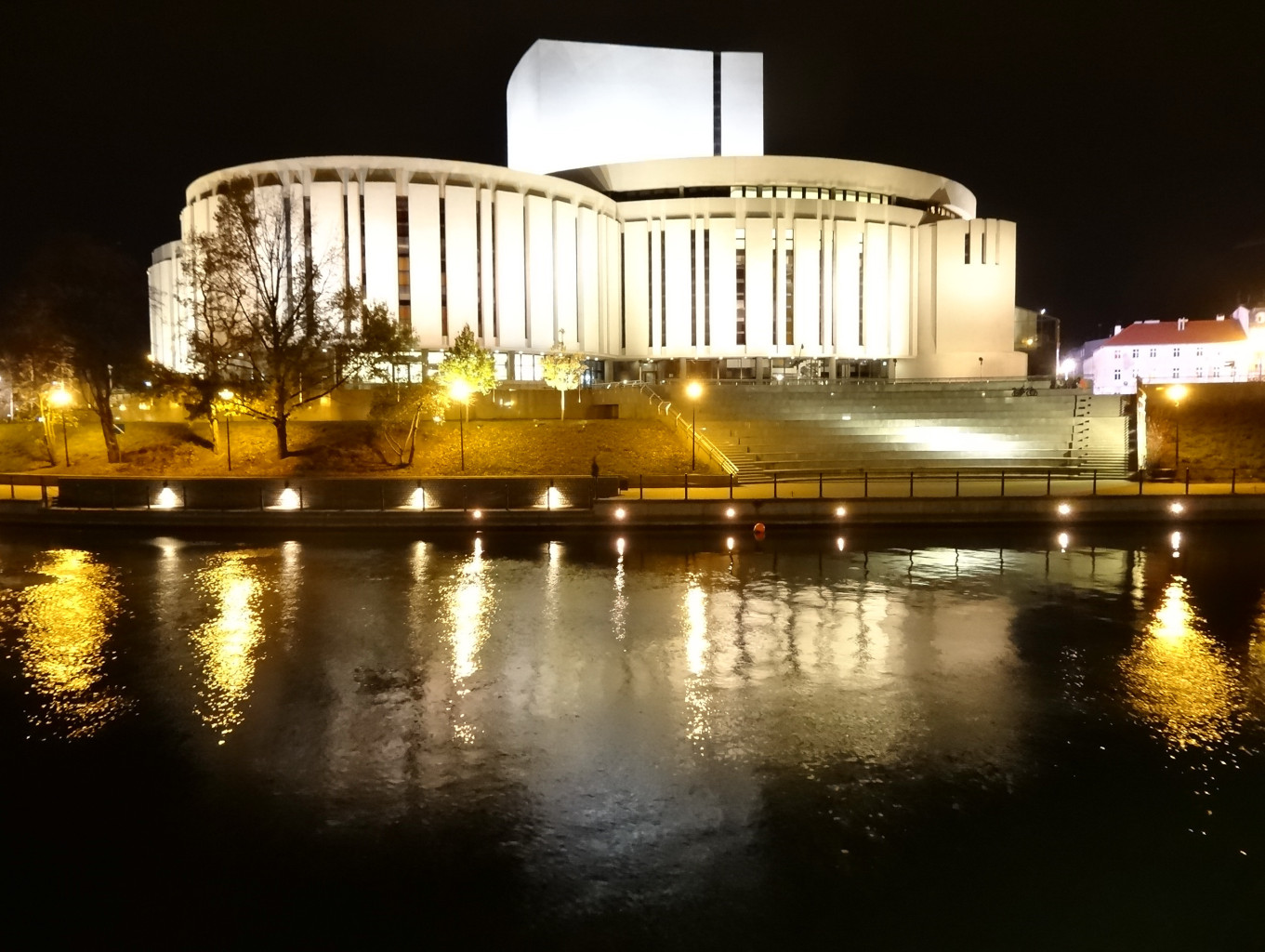
Opera house by night

In the 1960s, operas and operettas were performed far out Bydgoszcz Voivodeship, in places like Piła, Wałcz, Zielona Góra, Konin, Płock, Żary. Most popular couple on stage was then Barbara Zagórzanka and Henryk Herdzin. In 1971, Bydgoszcz Opera and Operetta had cumulated 2200 performances watched by 1.2 million people. Guest soloists from socialist countries and outstanding Polish artists were invited, such as: Bernard Ładysz, Bogdan Paprocki, Antonina Kawecka, Krystyna Szczepańska and Wieslaw Ochman.

The idea to build a new seat for the Opera company in Bydgoszcz appeared in 1960 and was strongly supported by the then director of Pomeranian Philharmonic, Andrzej Szwalbe. It was the only solution to avoid performances being scattered in several smaller stages all around the city (Polish Theatre, Chamber Theatre, Pomeranian House of Arts or movie theatre). These scenes were not fitted at all for soloists, choir, ballet and orchestra. In 1973, building started in a picturesque bend of the Brda river. Completion of the facility kept being delayed by high costs of construction and the deficit in materials and contractors. In the 1980s, facing budget cuts for culture, work came to a halt: some attempts were made to use the unfinished building, and realize cultural activities, like the first Bydgoszcz Opera Festival in 1994.

Bydgoszcz Opera Festival was a good omen for the future Opera Nova. Staged operas, operettas and ballets helped to appreciate the capabilities of exposing the great forms of stage in a new building, the acoustic qualities of the auditorium, the technical capacities of the scene and the skills of the orchestra, choir and ballet. In 1996, the Opera Nova employed 170 people, including 23 soloists, 30 ballet dancers, 44 chorus singers, 56 musicians and others (conductors, directors...). The repertoire comprised 18 pieces: 8 operas, 4 operettas, 4 ballets and 2 musicals. After 1996, the company realised about 200 performances, including 110 Bydgoszcz and more than 90 abroad (mainly in Germany, Austria, Netherlands and Belgium). Since 1996–1997, Opera Nova performances attract approximately 40 000 per season.

On 21 October 2006 the Bydgoszcz Opera House celebrated the 50th anniversary of the opera company in the city, together with the official completion of the Opera Nova building.

=== Performances ===
In May 2016, Opera Nova had staged the most famous works of opera, operetta, ballet and musical since its inception, among others:

- Carmen (1964, 1991, 1999)
- Faust (1960, 2015)
- The Tales of Hoffmann (1959, 1998)
- Manon (1979)
- La Bohème (1978, 2011)
- Tosca (1966, 1984, 2004)
- Madama Butterfly (1961, 1981)
- Suor Angelica (1992)
- Gianni Schicchi (1992)
- Turandot (1996)
- The Barber of Seville (1957, 1972, 1987, 2002)
- La Cenerentola (1967, 1985, 2009, 2015)
- The Magic Flute (1971, 1994)
- Don Giovanni (1997)
- The Marriage of Figaro (1979)
- Der Schauspieldirektor (1970, 1991)
- Eugene Onegin (1962, 1980)
- Prince Igor (1975)
- Nabucco (1995)
- La Traviata (1964, 1981, 1998, 2015)
- Rigoletto (1967, 1986, 2014)
- Il trovatore (1973)
- Un ballo in maschera (1984)
- Aida (1968, 1985)
- Don Carlos (1972, 2016)
- Otello (1989)
- The Flying Dutchman (1977)
- The Haunted Manor (1958, 1976, 1994)
- Halka (1961, 1981, 2013)
- The Countess (1960, 1982)
- Swan Lake (1972)
- The Nutcracker (1958, 1986, 2015)
- The sleeping Beauty (1994)
- Don Quixote (1996)
- The Gypsy Baron (1957, 1980, 1991)
- Die Fledermaus (1961, 1982, 1995)
- Eine Nacht in Venedig (1985)
- The Land of Smiles (1970, 1978, 1994)
- The Merry Widow (1966, 1988)
- Orpheus in the Underworld (1958, 1983, 1991 – adaptation under the title "Who wanted to kidnap Euridice?")
- Fiddler on the Roof (1992)
- My Fair Lady (1993, 2008, 2016).

== Opera House ==
=== History ===
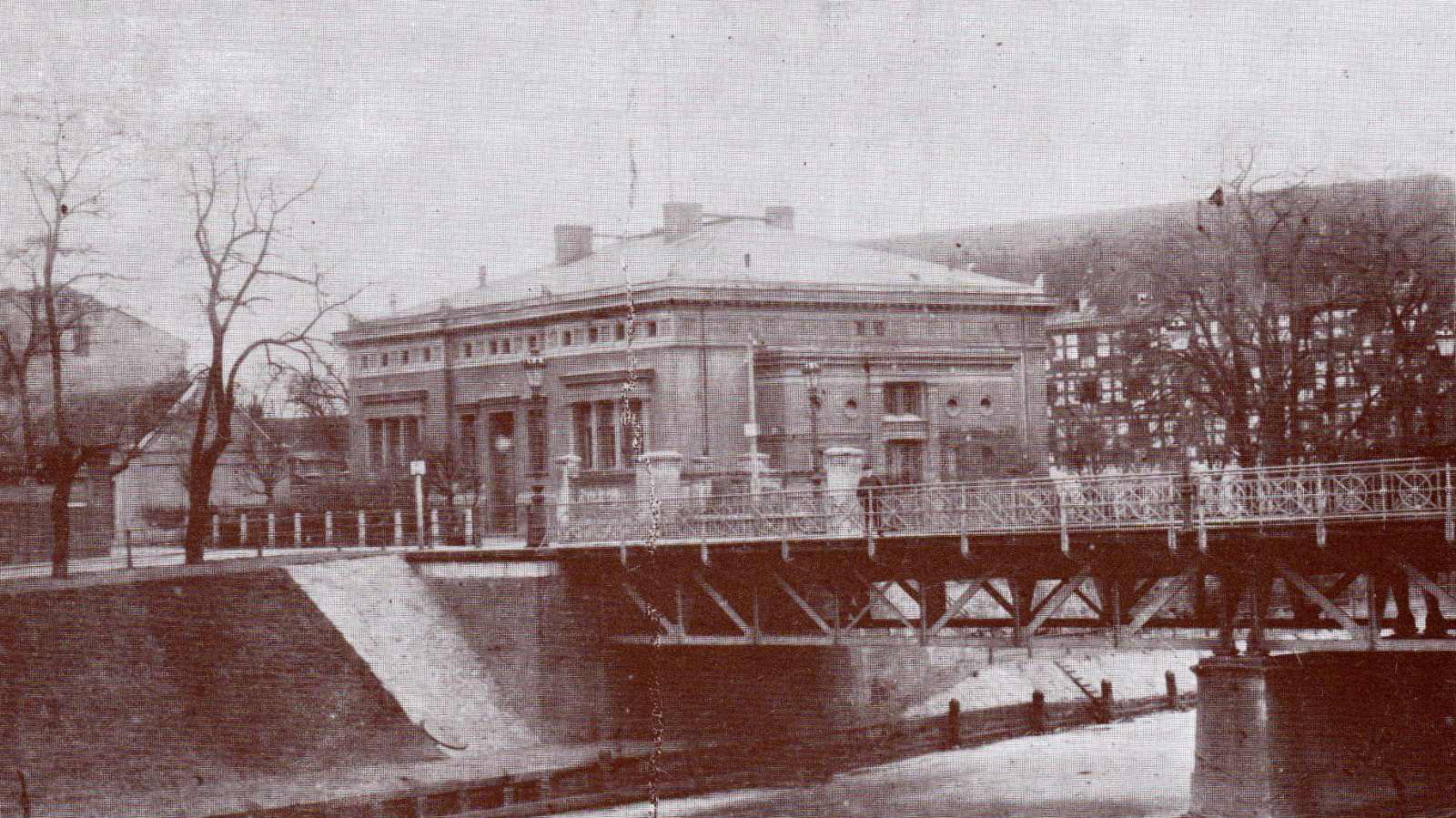
Old military mess and casino in 1890

The idea of a building dedicated to the Bydgoszcz Opera dates back to the 1950s and 1960s, soon after the nationalization of the institution. The first initiative came from Andrzej Schwalbe, then director of the Pomeranian Philharmonic: for him it was clear from the start that the co-existence in the long run under one roof of two companies and orchestras could not achieve the needed artistic stability. Rationale was the successful attendance at opera performances and the lack of large auditoriums in the city, capable of satisfying the growing artistic aspirations of the public.

In 1961 a meeting between representatives of Bydgoszcz Music Society, Musical Theatre, Pomeranian Philharmonic, administrative authorities and architects, agreed to launch the project of a musical theatre with two scenes and an art café. Different locations were considered for the future opera house: the place of the former Municipal Theatre, or Ludowy Park on Jagiellońska street, or again on the heights of Bydgoszcz. Finally the area chosen was the one between Focha street, Theatre square and Brda river. There have been standing large granaries -"Royal granaries" (Polish: spichrze królewski)- which burnt down in the 1960s. Only buildings left in the 1960s were military facilities (warehouses, mess, garrison command).

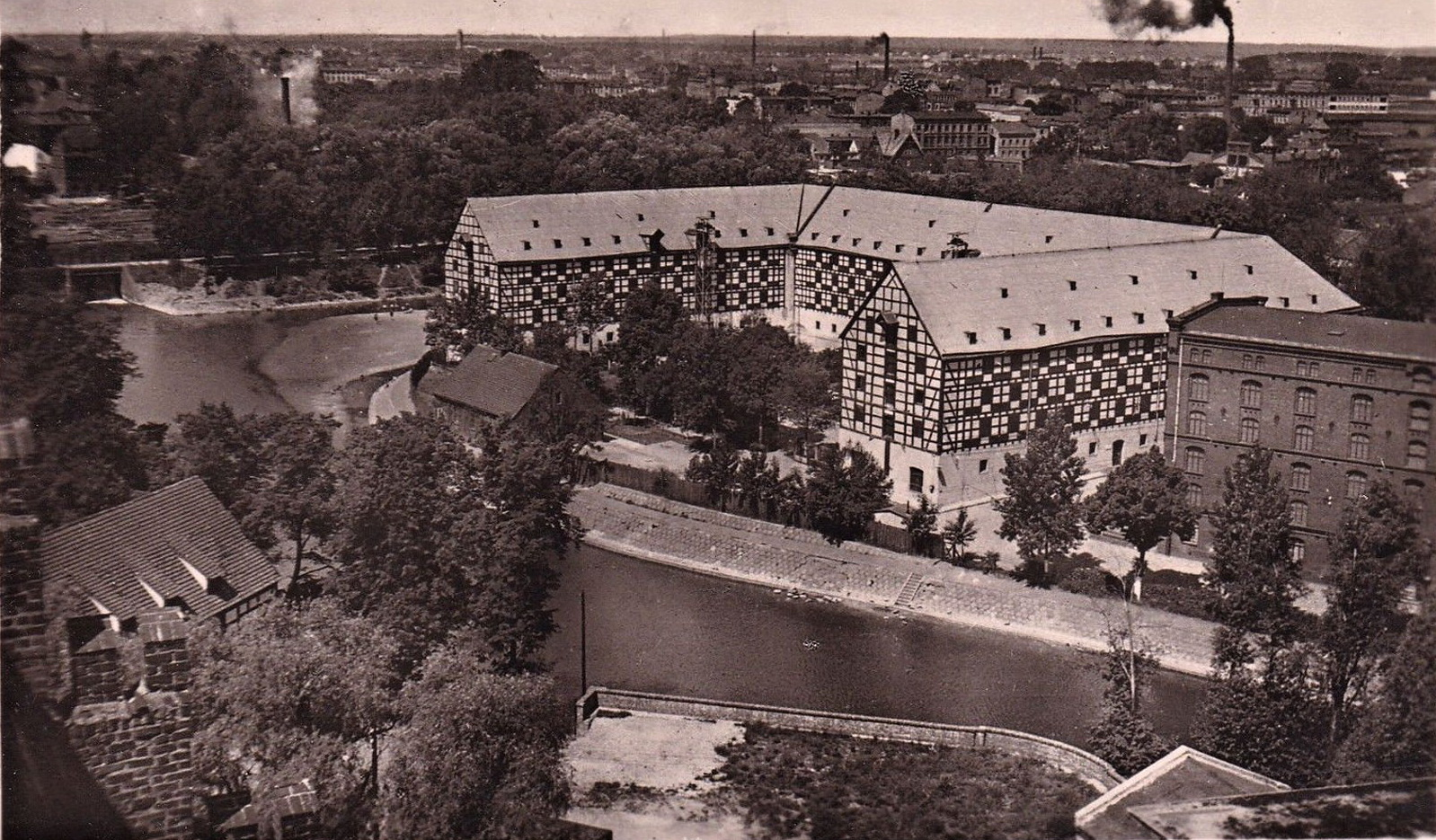
Former Royal Granaries

In May, the Association of Polish Architects announced a national contest to "develop the architectural design of the building of Musical Theatre and Drama in Bydgoszcz". Jury comprised architects of Bydgoszcz, Gdańsk, Poznań, Warsaw, and representatives from the Ministry of Culture and Art and the Pomeranian Philharmonic in Bydgoszcz. The prize winner was a young architect, Joseph Chmiel, who was also the author of the project for the Musical Theatre in Gdynia. The project presented an edifice composed of four intersecting circles, integrated into the meander of the Brda river.

In 1962 the design phase of the building started, supported by the Gdańsk University of Technology. The investment was planned in two steps, the first one from 1966 to 1971, the second stage after 1972. Contrary to expectations, construction did not start immediately, due to the delaying design work.

The building has been planned to use of all modern technical capacities: extended stage depth and proscenium, designed trapdoor and an external platform, which could lift the stage up to height meters. A panoramic scene portal was designed, with a fireproof front curtain, allowing, if necessary, an increased stage space. In this manner, the auditorium could be able function as a theatre scene and a conference stage. The auditorium itself has been designed on the model of a theatre of ancient Greece, without any partition between loges and balconies, so that the audience could feel closer to the artists. In 1973 building permits were issued and handed over to Budopol, the municipal firm in charge of the work. From 1973 to 1976, National Company "Hydrobudowa 9" from Poznań dug into the soil 1100 concrete piles. In the following years, design assumptions changed: from four intersecting rings, plans went down to two then eventually three. Issues to get building materials were recurrent and in 1977, at the time to secure the investment Polish Prime Minister Piotr Jaroszewicz canceled the project for economical reasons. However, local First Secretary of the Polish United Workers' Party in Bydgoszcz, Józef Majchrzak, decided to overrule Warsaw's decision by continuing the construction.

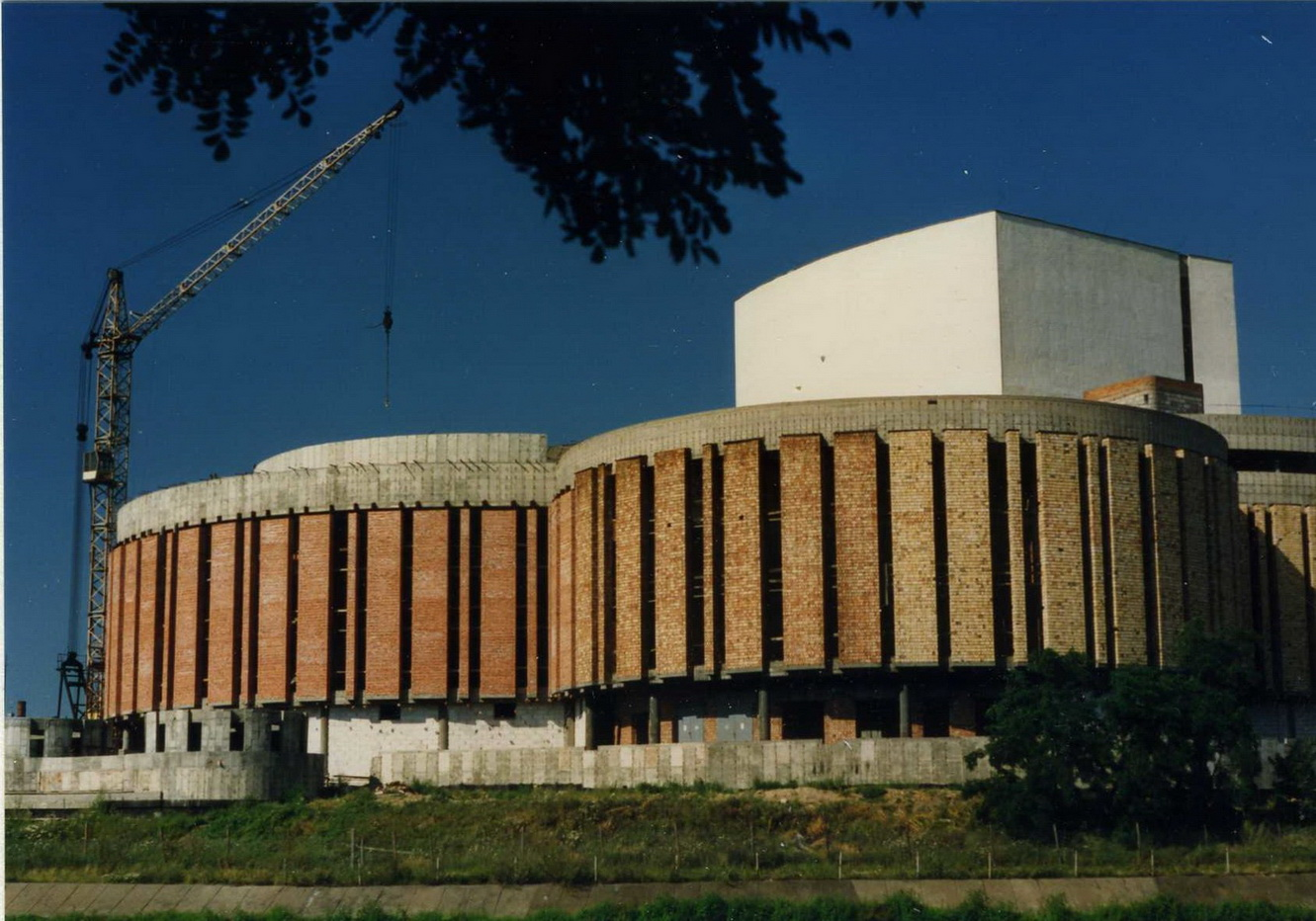
Building of Opera Nova in 1990

Although works were expected to end in 1982, the economic crisis of the 1980s reduced severely state funds allocated for culture, interrupting the construction. Building became a symbol of "eternal investments" and few people believed in its completion. It is only in 1985, thanks to an increased effort of provincial administrative authorities and cultural lobbies, that the continuation of the construction was insured through the National Culture Development Fund. In 1986, former military warehouses and Headquarters Garrison were at last demolished, getting the work accelerated. Between 1990 and 1994 the main body of the edifice housing the auditorium and the main stage was glazed, and the work moved to dressing rooms and rehearsal rooms, all of which was carried out by a specialized Company, "Teatr" from Warsaw. With the end of communist era, the Fund for the Development of Culture was liquidated, putting another threat to postpone the completion of the building. Construction was then focusing on the third circle, planned to host offices (TVP3 Bydgoszcz), a convention center and restaurants. Around this date, initiative was taken to use the raw building to organize the first Bydgoszcz Opera Festival: main points were to draw attention of the public and decision makers on this important project and to raise funds for its achievement.

The first Bydgoszcz Opera Festival took place from 17 to 30 April 1994, in the harsh surroundings of the building. The second half of 1990s brought a major positive change in the socio-political climate, helping out with investment, mainly from the provincial authorities. The construction of the Opera Nova in Bydgoszcz gained modern architectural solutions, new technologies, materials and theatrical capacities. The final stage of the investment occurred in the years 2002 to 2008: government of Kuyavian-Pomeranian Voivodeship decided to change the function of the third circle (originally, the area planned for production and decorations storage), so as to create a large convention center, where could be organized symposiums, meetings and congresses. Rationale behind such a decision was money related since the convention center approximately cost 20 million zł against 60 million zł for the initial project. The building officially started operating on 21 October 2006, with a gala celebrating the 50th anniversary of the Opera activity in Bydgoszcz. Construction of Bydgoszcz opera house lasted 34 years and 5 months and is considered one of the longest building projects for a theatre in post-war Poland. The Lublin Musical theatre, however, is second to none in this contest, since its project started in 1974 and has only been completed on 22 November 2015.

In the years following its achievement, the Opera Nova has been used as a Regional Convention Center, organizing a number of cultural events and festivals. Since 2010, it houses the international Film festival Camerimage.

To accommodate the growing success of Camerimage, a project of extension is currently underway. A fourth lobe to the actual building will be added, comprising a projection room for about 350 seats and an exhibition centre.

== Architecture ==
The building, by its own size, stands out in the architectural environment of the city centre: it has 6 levels, covers an area of 24 432 m^{2}, has a volume of 120 700 m^{3} and a height of 34.19 m. Its location along the Brda river provides an opening to the Mill Island. The building, with its three connecting circles, affords optimal conditions for the realization of opera, operetta, ballet and musicals. Because of its original shape and position by the water, Opera Nova is often compared to the Sydney Opera House. The building has an illumination light system, one of Bydgoszcz hallmark by night.

The First Circle hosts the main auditorium for 803 people, a large stage, two rehearsal rooms – for ballet and chorus, costumes storing area and a chamber hall with 189 seats (beneath the auditorium). It also houses workshops (clothing, hairdressing, wigs...)

The Second circle houses a ventilation chamber in the basement, on the ground floor an actor club, a large orchestra hall and a ballet rehearsal area, two floors for dressing rooms (choir and ballet), and on the top floor administration offices.

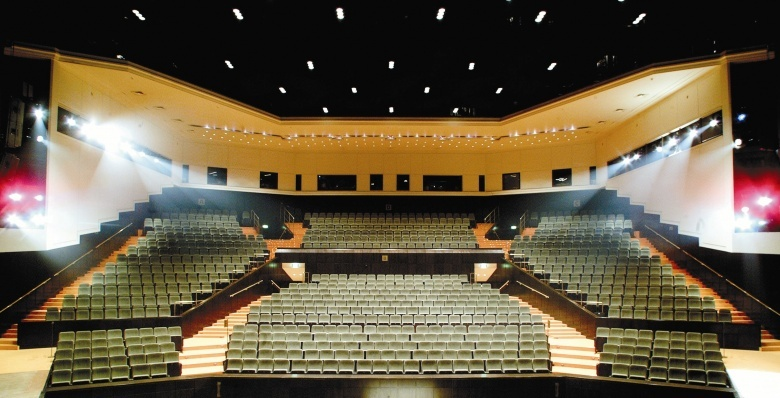
Main Auditorium at Opera Nova

The Third circle is devoted to the Opera Nova Convention Center, with two conference rooms (more than 200 seats each), allowing the organization of large symposiums or seminars. There are also the Department of Promotion (entrance from Focha Street) and the restaurant "Maestra".

=== Interiors ===
The large auditorium has a capacity of 803 seating places and 6 seats for disabled, the scene covers an area of 420 m^{2} (22 m wide and 25 m deep), and houses theatre equipment and lighting, and a revolving stage (11,80 m diameter). The scene portal is 9,5 m high and 18 m wide. The front curtain is steel and textile made, comprising 6 layers (10 m high and 21 m wide). The hall has an appreciated acoustic; it gives onto the lobby and two mezzanines.

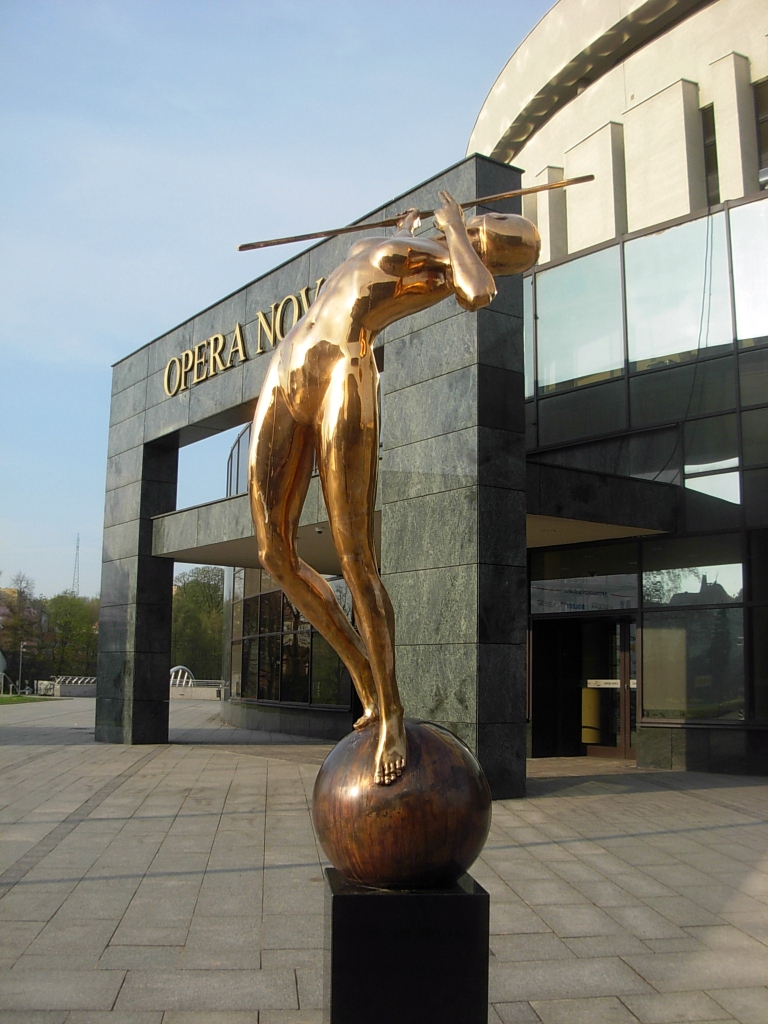
"New Archer"

The Chamber hall named after professor Felicia Krysiewicz, has 189 seats and 3 places for disabled. This Hall is generally used for chamber music, recitals, concerts and cinema projection.

Main hall and foyer are spaces for the audience to wander during breaks. They house painting, sculpture and photography exhibitions.

Behind the scenes are a number of workshops, warehouses, rehearsal rooms, dressing rooms. There is also Poland's largest elevator for transporting decorations and set pieces.

The Restaurant Maestra is located in the third circle of the building. Its interior is decorated with pictures from Opera Nova performances and a poster collection of the Bydgoszcz Opera Festival.

=== Surroundings ===
Opera Nova close neighborhood includes:

- an observation deck connected to the bank of Brda river;
- a footbridge joining Mill Island in Bydgoszcz, through which you can reach Venice of Bydgoszcz or the Old market (Polish: Stary Rynek);
- at the bottom of Opera Nova, a summer amphitheater for 200 people giving onto the river. In 2016, a stage will be built on the river from the quay.

On 19 April 2013, to celebrate the 667th anniversary of the city charter, a modern sculpture of The archer has been unveiled in front of the opera house, called the "New Archer" (Polish: "Łuczniczka Nova").

=== Conference Center ===
Congress Centre Opera Nova, occupying the third circle of the building, provides professional support for symposia, conferences, trade shows, conventions, exhibitions, anniversaries and performances of small theatrical plays. The Center houses two conference rooms ("Manru" and "Fidelio") for 300 and 220 people, five seminar rooms and a restaurant, "Maestro" with catering facilities.

Both rooms are equipped with electrically folding stands, electro-acoustic and simultaneous translation booths. In addition, equipment includes:

- audio-visual capacities managed by touch panels
- multimedia kiosks with Internet access
- multimedia presentations capabilities.

Combined use of the large Auditorium and the conference centre allow hosting very large gathering (up to 1,500 people).

== Musical ensembles ==
=== Soloists ===
Opera Nova company includes more than 50 solo singers:

- 15 sopranos,
- 8 mezzo-sopranos,
- 15 tenors
- 10 baritones,
- 7 basses,

along with actors, assistants, tutors and other staff personnel.

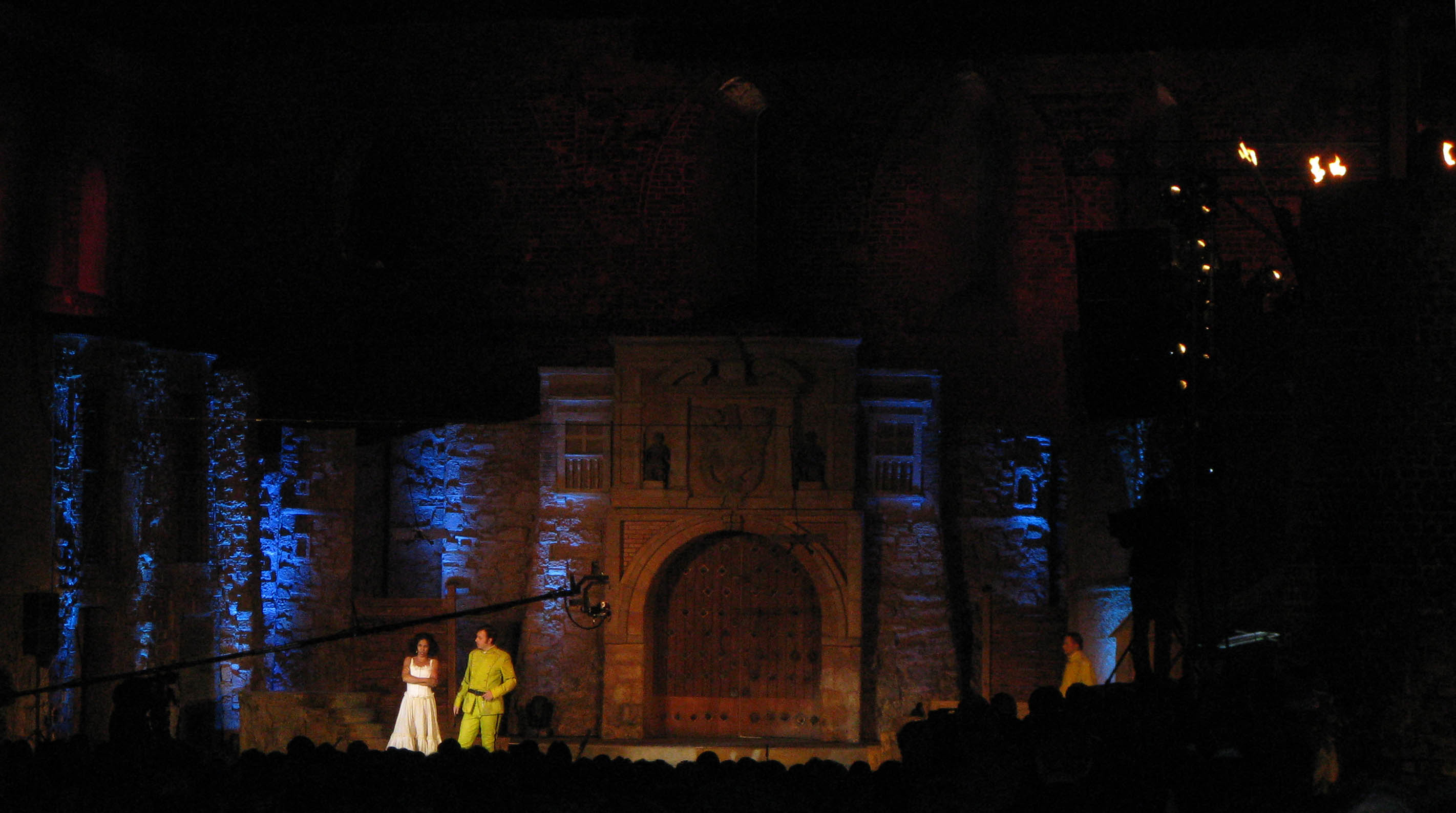
Performance of Carmen in 2008

=== Orchestra ===
From 1956 to 1963, 40 musicians from Bydgoszcz Pomeranian Philharmonic were playing for each opera performance. A professional Opera Nova orchestra was established in 1963, comprising initially 36 musicians, the majority of whom were graduates from the Bydgoszcz Music Academy - "Feliks Nowowiejski". Several conductors led this group:

- Zbigniew Chwedczuk
- Zdzislaw Wendyński
- Zygmunt Szczepanski
- Zbigniew Droszcz
- Włodzimierz Ormicki
- Joseph Klimanka
- Stanisław Renz
- Adam Palka
- Mieczyslaw Dondajewski
- Jerzy Katlewicz
- Mieczyslaw Nowakowski
- Zygmunt Rychert
- Boguslaw Madey
- Vadim Perevoznikov
- Włodzimierz Szymanski
- Jerzy Wołosiuk
- Ruben Silva
- Maciej Figas
- Piotr Wajrak
- Andrzej Straszyński
- Tadeusz Wojciechowski
- Andrzej Knap

Today, Opera Nova orchestra is 68 musicians strong, and its main conductor is the director of the Opera, Maciej Figas. Its yearly repertoire includes 32 pieces, mainly operas, operettas, ballets, oratorios, musicals from contemporary, popular and classical music. The orchestra always performs to accompany Opera Nova singers, as well as guest stars during galas in Poland and abroad.

=== Choir ===
The Opera Nova Choir was established in 1956, under the leadership of Antoni Rybka. Most of its members were recruited from the "Arion" choir in Bydgoszcz. Consecutive Choir directors of the Choir have been Czeslaw Kaczmarek (1982–1984), Maciej Banach (1991–1992) and Henryk Wierzchoń (1984–1991 and since 1993). Over the years the choir mastered most of the works of world literature, opera, operetta, musicals and oratorios. Currently, choir band reaches approximately 80 people.

Choir is augmented to stage performances of musical works with symphony orchestras: Pomeranian Philharmonic (for Bydgoszcz Music Festival), Koszalin Philharmonic and foreign. It is also involved in tours.

=== Ballet ===
Opera Nova Ballet was founded in 1956, initially with 40 dancers, in majority graduated students from Bydgoszcz ballet music center. Between 1959 and 1989, the ballet ensemble had a training room in the Chamber Theatre, then in the Pomeranian Arts House. Since the 1990s, the ballet working room is located in the building of the Opera Nova. Ballet repertoire includes around 30 works.

Since its creation, the ballet premiered 6 times in Poland for The Nutcracker (1958), The King of the winds (Polish: Król wichrów) by Feliks Nowowiejski (1963), Legend of love (Russian: Легенда о любви) by Melikov (1967), The Tale of the Stone Flower (Russian: Сказ о каменном цветке) by Sergei Prokofiev (1970), Anna Karenina by Rodion Shchedrin (1979) and a world premiere, the fairy tale ballet Puss in boots by Bogdan Pawlowski (1997). In 2011, ballet company was about 50 people strong, led by Ilona Jaświn-Madejska.

From 1995, with the creation of the Opera Nova Ballet Studio, children and youth groups follow shortened course ballet school. Some of their members are involved in performances of ballet and musicals.

== Bydgoszcz Opera Festival ==
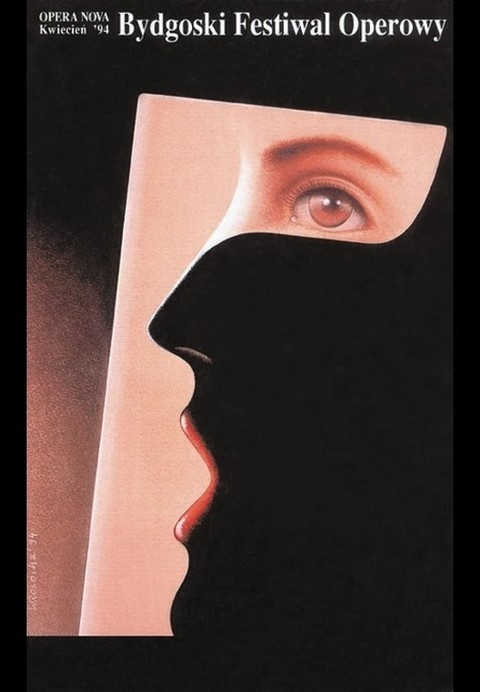
Poster of the 1st edition of Bydgoszcz Opera Festival

=== History ===
Bydgoszcz Opera Festival was born in 1994, associated with the difficulties to achieve the project of the Opera Nova building started in 1973. From 17 to 30 April 1994, the best troupes of Polish opera performed on the unfinished opera stage – Poznań, Łódź and Warsaw, Warsaw Chamber Opera, but also Askold Makarov Theatre Ballet of Saint Petersburg. All sessions were held in a harsh scenery of bare walls, and the audience was set in 500 wooden chairs borrowed from the military. The numerous audience which came to this unusual event rewarded the artists and the direction, creating a sublime festival. The almost eerie musical environment became one of the main strength of the event. It received a positive welcome from the artists and the audience, and provided a nationwide publicity for Bydgoszcz opera stage. The festival had reached its main goal: to stop a 20-year long procrastination in the construction of the opera house.

The success of subsequent editions exceeded organizers' expectations: tickets were sold out long before the first day. With such possibilities, added to the new scene of Bydgoszcz opera house, it was possible to create large-scale performances of opera and ballet. For instance:

- Giuseppe Verdi's Macbeth performed by company from the Warsaw Grand Theatre (2nd edition, 1995);
- Giuseppe Verdi's La forza del destino presented by the Grand Theatre of Poznań (8th edition, 2001);
- Modest Mussorgsky's opera Boris Godunov performed by the National Opera of Kyiv (3rd edition, 1996);
- Turandot by Giacomo Puccini, presented by Opera Nova troupe at the opening of the 3rd edition (1996).

For the first time in Bydgoszcz were presented the following ballets:

- Aram Khachaturian's Spartacus performed by the Grand Academic Ballet Theatre of Belarus in Belarus Minsk (2nd edition, 1995);
- Prokofiev's Cinderella executed by the Royal ballet of Antwerp (6th edition, 1999);
- Léo Delibes's Coppélia performed by the Latvian National Opera in Riga (7th edition, 2000).

Through the Festival occurrences, other famous companies performed: troupe from Chicago (7th edition, 2000) or the Cullberg Ballet from Sweden which executed a modern choreography of the Sleeping Beauty (7th edition, 2001).

=== Characteristics ===
Opera Festival Bydgoszcz is the biggest Polish review of diverse musical genres in the area of opera, operetta, musical and ballet, both classic and modern. Various opera companies present here their latest artistic achievements. It is a tradition to invite, in addition to the main Polish troupes, at least one company from abroad. The troupe from the Opera Nova, at the inauguration of each festival always premieres. The festival is held annually in the spring season: April or May.

For the 2016 edition, the Opera Nova premiered Don Carlos. Polish scenes invited to perform are Łódź Grand Theatre, Wrocław Opera, the ballet School of Poznań, Polish National Ballet. Foreign guests are the Czech National Theatre in Brno and the Chinese Shanghai Ballet Company.

The festival is funded by the Marshal Office of Kuyavian-Pomeranian Voivodeship, the city of Bydgoszcz, the Ministry of Culture and National Heritage and private sponsors.

The festival is accompanied by exhibitions, a review of music videos on DVD and an Opera Youth Forum, as a review of chamber operas performed by students of Polish and foreign music academies.

== Miscellaneous ==
- Bydgoszcz prima donna were, among others: Lidia Skowron (1960s and 1970s), Barbara Zagórzanka and Barbara Nitecka (1980s), Katarzyna Rymarczyk and Magdalena Krzyńska.
- During Polish People's Republic, the most successful turnout at Opera Nova has been musicals: Winged lover and Thank you, Eve in the second half of the 1970s.
- Until 1976, bass-baritone soloist [Bronisław Pekowski, was chief director of the Regional Geodesy and Cartography Company while staging at the Opera Nova.
- Opera Nova soloists have been invited abroad, including Georgia, Russia, Romania, Hungary, Japan, Bulgaria, Greece, Italy, Germany and former Soviet Republics.
- Since 1989, the opera company has been holding an annual tour abroad to perform operas, ballets and operettas: Italy and Malta in 1989 (Rigoletto, Otello, Madama Butterfly); Netherlands in 1990; and Belgium in 1992.

== Directors ==
List of the Directors of Bydgoszcz Opera:

- 1956: Zdzisław Wendyński (Opera Studio)
- 1956–1960: Felicja Krysiewicz
- 1960–1963: Feliks Kłodziński ( Musical Theatre of Opera and Operetta)
- 1963–1964: Zygmunt Szczepański
- 1964–1969: Zdzisław Wendyński
- 1969–1970: Maurycy Leszczycki
- 1970–1973: Mieczysław Rak
- 1973–1977: Tadeusz Kłobucki
- 1977–1979: Stanisław Renz
- 1979–1980: Adam Pałka
- 1981–1990: Alicja Weber (State Opera and Operetta in Bydgoszcz)
- 1990: Rafał Delekta
- 1990–1991: Andrzej Jurkiewicz (Opera Nova)
- 1991–1992: Andrzej Maria Marczewski
- Since 1992: Maciej Figas

== Gallery ==
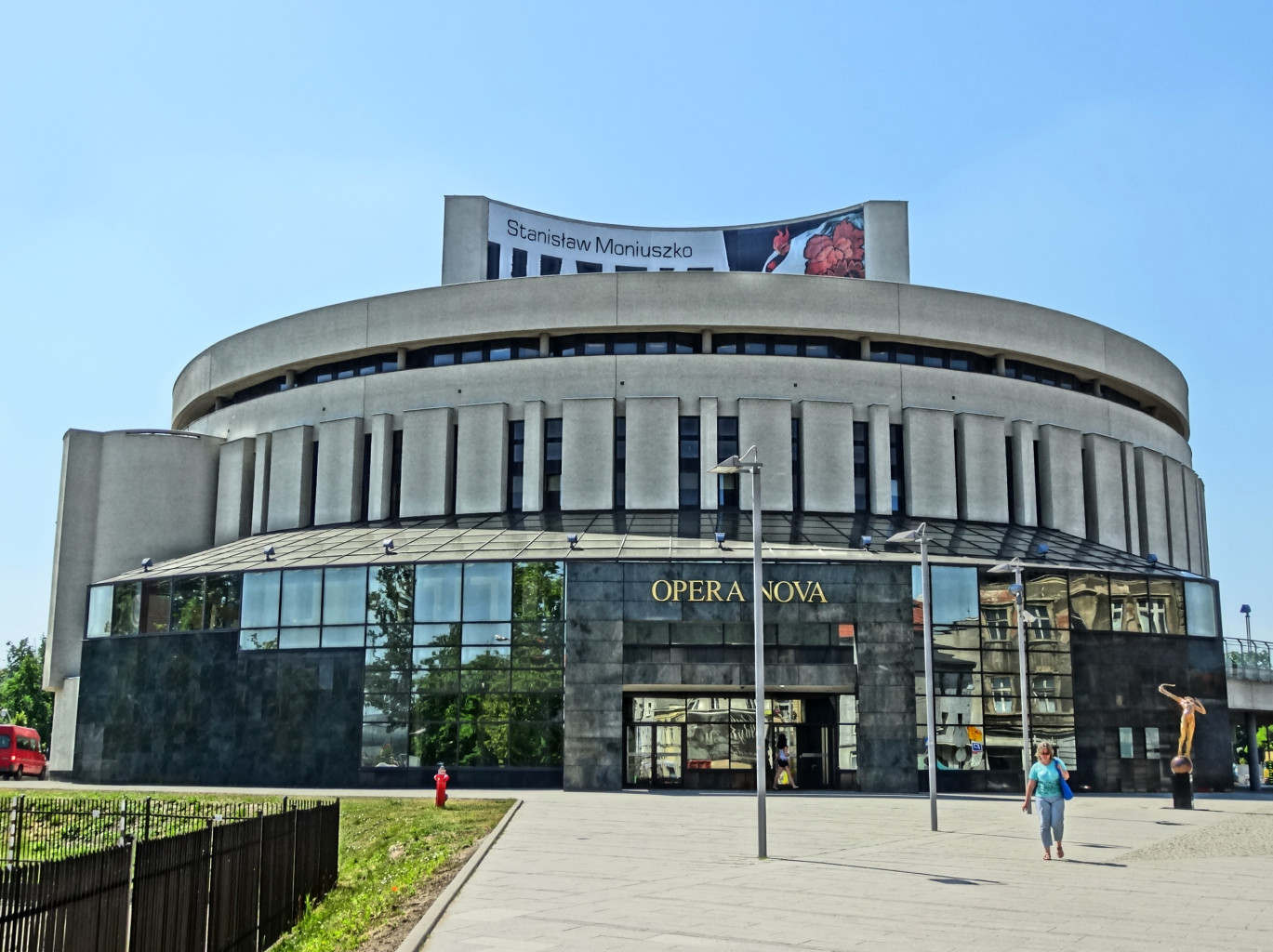
Main entrance on Focha Street

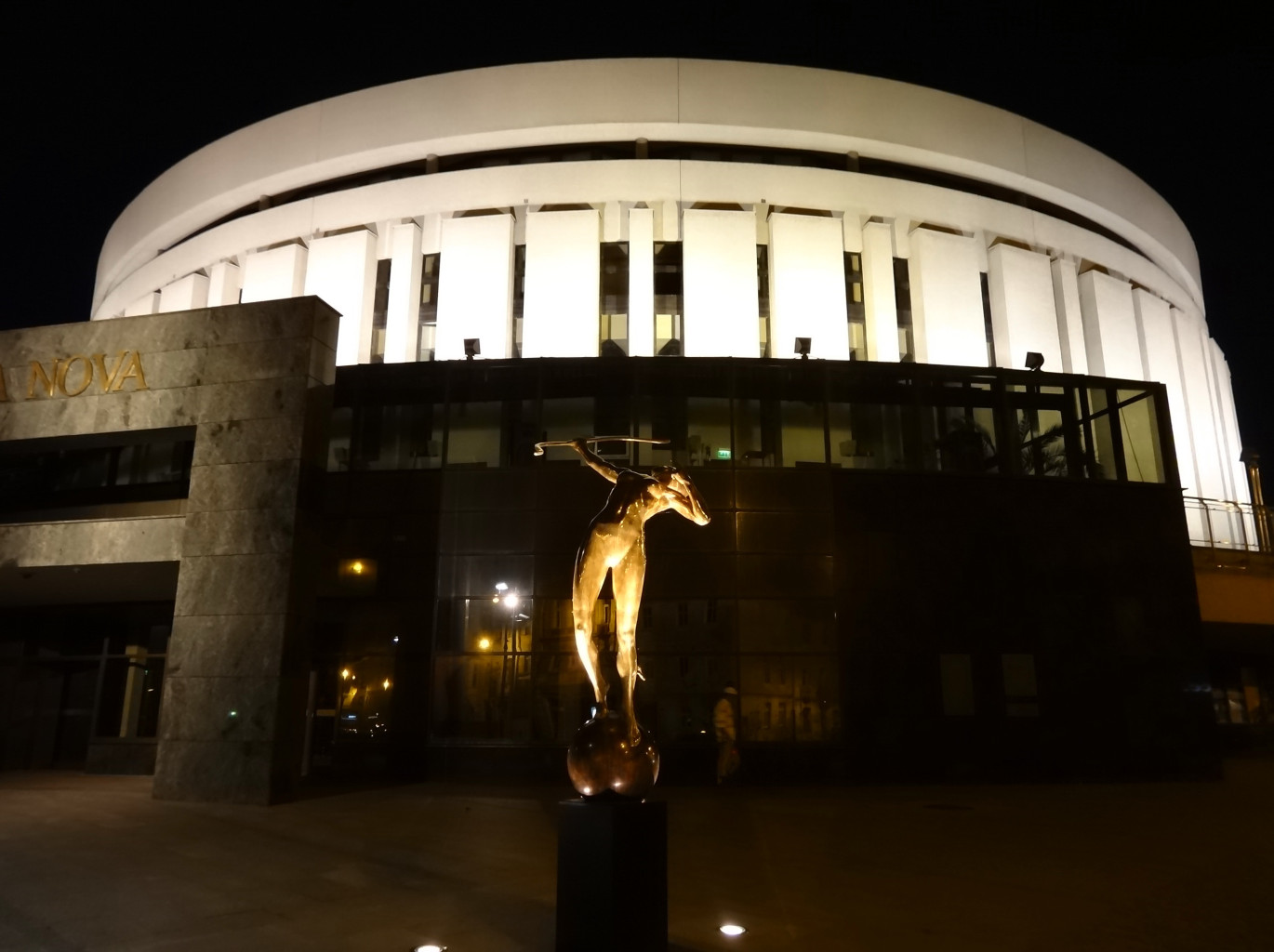
Main entrance by night

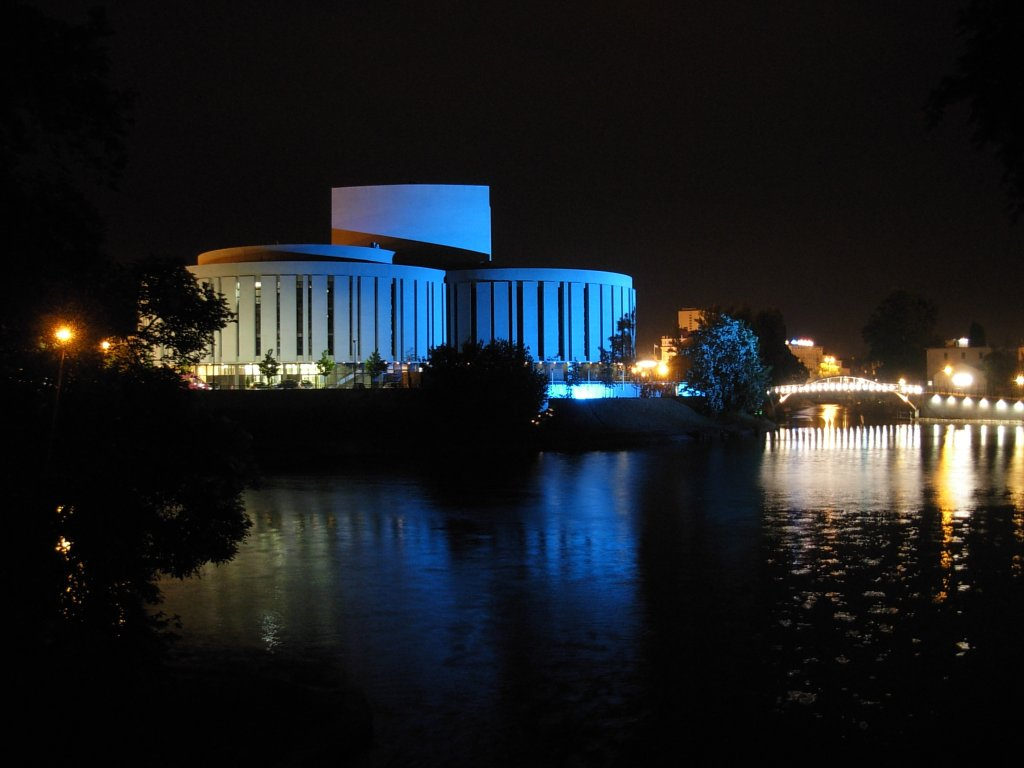
By night, viewed from Mill Island

== Bibliography ==
- Bacciarelli, Krystyna (1995). Muzyka pierwszego kręgu… budowy. Kalendarz Bydgoski (in Polish). Bydgoszcz: Towarzystwo Miłosnikow Miasta Bydgoszczy. pp. 106–111.
- Bacciarelli, Krystyna (1994). Ostatni teatr muzyczny w Europie. Kalendarz Bydgoski (in Polish). Bydgoszcz: Towarzystwo Miłosnikow Miasta Bydgoszczy. pp. 67–73.
- Karczewski, Piotr (2000). Belcanto nad Brdą czyli dzieje opery w Bydgoszczy. Kalendarz Bydgoski (in Polish). Bydgoszcz: Towarzystwo Miłosnikow Miasta Bydgoszczy. pp. 213–218.
- Karczewski, Piotr (2002). Festiwal z desperacji. Kalendarz Bydgoski (in Polish). Bydgoszcz: Towarzystwo Miłosnikow Miasta Bydgoszczy.
- Maniszewska, Małgorzata (2000). Miasto muzyki. Kalendarz Bydgoski (in Polish). Bydgoszcz: Towarzystwo Miłosnikow Miasta Bydgoszczy. pp. 185–196.
- Prus Zdzisław, Weber Alicja (2002). Bydgoski leksykon operowy (in Polish). Bydgoszcz: Kujawsko-Pomorskie Towarzystwo Kulturalne. ISBN 8385327622.
- Mrozek, Zdzisław (2004). Cztery gracje bydgoskiego teatru muzycznego. Kalendarz Bydgoski (in Polish). Bydgoszcz: Towarzystwo Miłosnikow Miasta Bydgoszczy.
- Weber, Alicja (1996). Z dziejów opery w Bydgoszczy w czasach II Rzeczypospolitej. Kalendarz Bydgoski (in Polish). Bydgoszcz: Towarzystwo Miłosnikow Miasta Bydgoszczy. pp. 273–281.
- Weber, Alicja (1999). Opera Nova w Bydgoszczy. Kalendarz Bydgoski (in Polish). Bydgoszcz: Towarzystwo Miłosnikow Miasta Bydgoszczy. pp. 141–148.
- Weber, Alicja (2008). Złote gody bydgoskiej opery. Kalendarz Bydgoski (in Polish). Bydgoszcz: Towarzystwo Miłosnikow Miasta Bydgoszczy.
- Weber, Alicja (2009). Miłośnicy sztuki operowej. Kalendarz Bydgoski (in Polish). Bydgoszcz: Towarzystwo Miłosnikow Miasta Bydgoszczy.
- Weber, Alicja (2011). Ostatni teatr XX wieku, czyli niezwykła historia budowy opery w Bydgoszczy. Kronika Bydgoska XXXII (in Polish). Bydgoszcz: Towarzystwo Miłosnikow Miasta Bydgoszczy – Bydgoskie Towarzystwo Naukowe.
- Wolny, Ryszard (1972). Świątynia muzy nielekkiej. Kalendarz Bydgoski (in Polish). Bydgoszcz: Towarzystwo Miłosnikow Miasta Bydgoszczy. pp. 131–136.
