= Halka (disambiguation) =

Halka is an 1854 opera by Polish composer Stanisław Moniuszko.

Halka may also refer to:

- "Halka" (song), 1996 release by Swedish alternative rock band Kent
- Halka (1930 film), a Polish musical adaptation of the opera directed by Konstanty Meglicki
- Halka (1937 film), a Polish musical adaptation of the opera directed by Juliusz Gardan
