= Witold Zdzitowiecki =

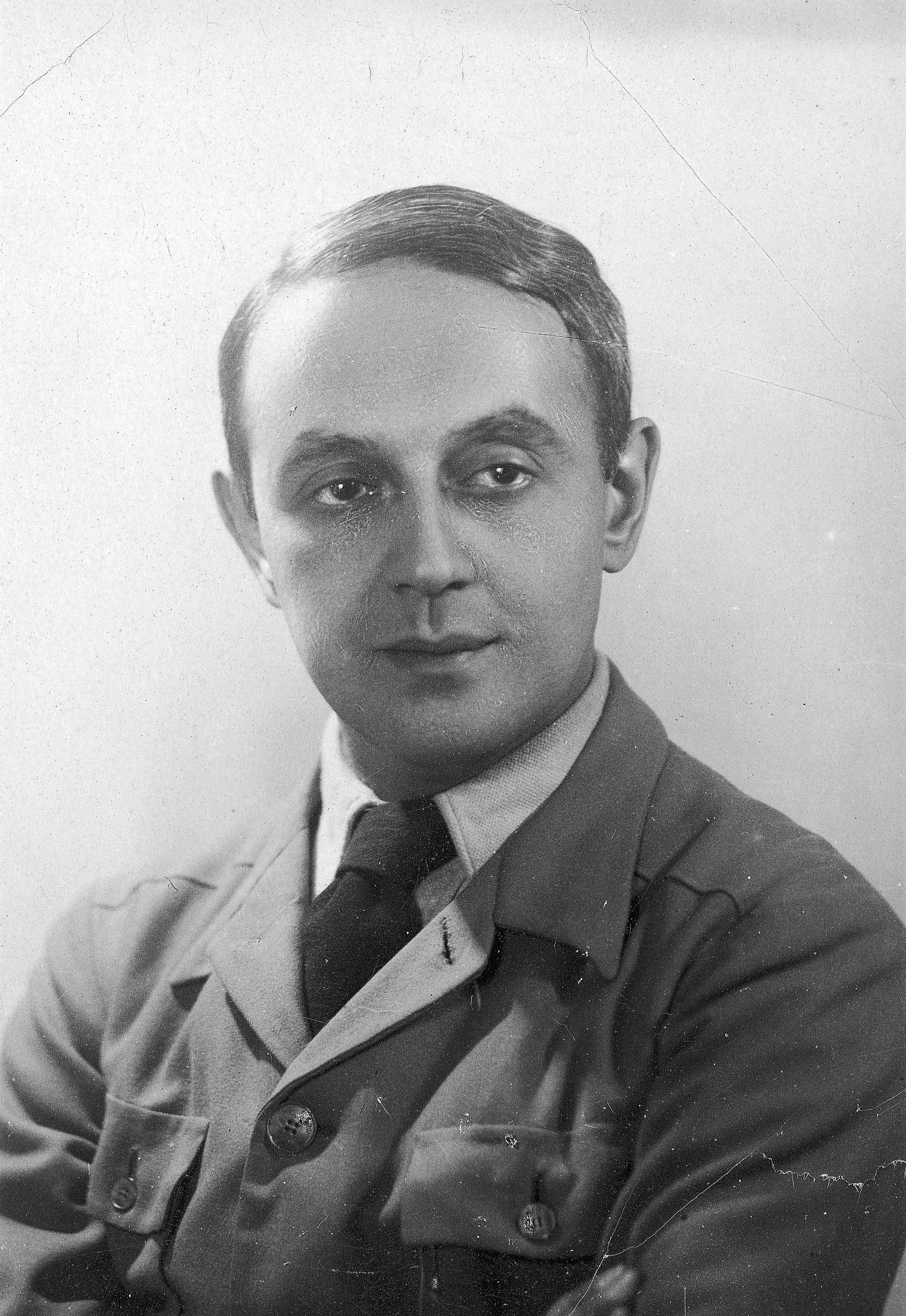
- Zdzitowiecki in 1935

Background information
- Born: 22 October 1896; Łomża
- Died: 15 September 1960 (aged 63); Gliwice
- Genres: Operetta, musical theatre, comedy
- Occupations: singer, actor, director
- Instruments: Tenor
- Years active: 1918-1960

Witold Zdzitowiecki (22 October 1896, Łomża – 15 September 1960, Gliwice) - Polish theatre director, actor and singer, best known as an operetta director.

== Life ==
He was born to Zygmunt Zdzitowiecki and Wanda née Trzaska-Niemirowski. He attended a gymnasium, music school and at the drama courses of Józefa Hryniewicka. During World War I, he stayed in Moscow, where in 1916 he made his acting debut (probably at the Polish Theatre). In 1918 he performed in Warsaw at the Sfinks theatre, in the theatrical season 1918/1919 at the Black Cat theatre, and in the season 1919/1920 at the Warsaw Dramatic Theatre. It was then that he also started working as a director.

In 1920–24 he performed at the Rozmaitości Theatre and Reduta Theatre in Warsaw; In 1923 he also performed at the Stańczyk cabaret in Warsaw, and as a guest at the Nowości Theatre. In the years 1924–26 he belonged to the team of the Municipal Theatre in Toruń as an actor, director and literary manager of the operetta department. In August 1926 he made a guest appearance in Włocławek. In the 1926/27 season, he was the artistic director of the Eldorado Theatre in Warsaw, where he staged, among others, operettas. In the 1927–29 seasons, Zdzitowiecki returned to the Municipal Theatre in Toruń to work as an actor and director of operettas and musical comedies. In the 1929/30 season he performed with a Polish ensemble at Casino de Paris, and in 1930–32 he worked in Toruń and in the theatre in Włocławek; in 1932 he directed operetta performances at the Grand Theatre, Poznań. Then he worked in Warsaw: in 1932–34 he was an actor and director at the 8.30 Theatre, in 1934–36 he was a director at the Grand Theatre, Warsaw in 1936 a director at the Operetta Theatre at ul. Karowa, and from November 1936 until the outbreak of World War II, he was the artistic director and director of operettas at the Theatre 8.15.

In the 1930s, he was preparing his film directorial debut, an adaptation of The Picture of Dorian Gray. Zdzitowiecki's protege (and privately a lover), actor Harry Cort, was to play the main role. The project was not realized, however, due to Cort's arrest in France for drug possession in 1935.

August 1939, after the first night showing of "Panna Wodna" ("Water Maiden") operetta in 8.15 theatre, Zdzitowiecki gave a political speech against the German art and operettas. In the first months of the occupation, he wrote articles for the underground newspaper "Głos Polski", printed in the apartment of his partner, Karol Benda. For several months, Zdzitowiecki hid in his apartment a journalist and writer of Jewish origin, Jadwiga Migowa, and the Jewish husband of his housekeeper.

Zdzitowiecki was blackmailed by the director of public theatres, Stanisław Heinrich, who threatened to reveal the anti-German statement from 1939, unless Zdzitowiecki would work in German-controlled legally operating theatres. From 14 September 1941 to 2 June 1944 he worked as an artistic director, director, actor and comedy writer at the Maska theatre. For this activity, on 13 May 1944, by the judgment of the Directorate of Underground Resistance, he was punished with a public shaving of his head.

After the war, Zdzitowiecki sued the courts and committees of the Union of Polish Stage Artists (ZASP) for his public image. On 25 February 1945 he was removed from the list of members of the ZASP, against which the director appealed. A large group of artists whom he helped during the occupation stood in his defense. On 7 December 1947 he was reinstated as a member of the ZASP, with a "severe" reprimand.

In the late 1940s and 1950s, Zdzitowiecki kept working as a director in Warsaw, Łódź and Gliwice, but he did not regain his former position in the artistic world. For many years he was involved in pedagogical work; having tutored Barbara Kostrzewska, Lucyna Szczepańska and Feliks Szczepański, Marian Wawrzkowicz, Beata Artemska, Elżbieta Zakrzewska, Wanda Polańska. He died on 15 September 1960 in Gliwice, aged 64.
