= Harry Cort =

Polish actor

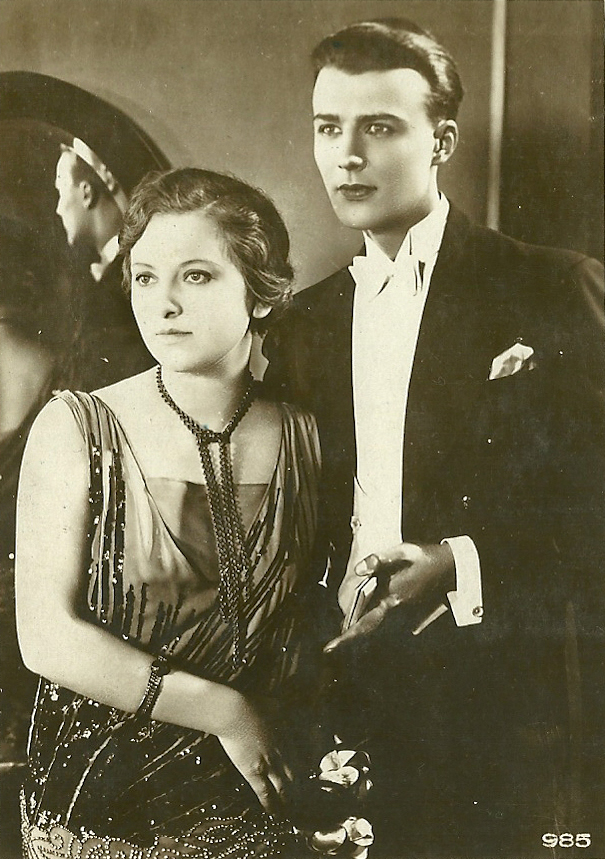
- Iza Norska and Harry Cort (1930)
- Born: Stanisław Józef Bielski; 19 March 1908; Trzeszczany
- Died: 30 January 1979 (aged 70); Phoenix, Arizona
- Years active: 1929–1934, 1946
- Spouse: Jeannine Marie de la Concepcion Renée de Giureoye (1939–1943)

Stanisław Józef Bielski, performing as Harry Cort (19 March 1908, Trzeszczany - 30 January 1979, Phoenix, Arizona) was a Polish film and theater actor, criminal, and subject of scandal.

== Life ==
Stanisław came from a noble family that initially used Jelita coat of arms, but then (falsely) claimed the rights to the princely title and the coat of arms Pogoń Litewska of long-extinct Gedyminowicz-Bielski branch. At the end of World War I, he supposedly (according to his own accounts) travelled with his father Jan Edward Bielski, covering Southern Europe, Africa and Asia. After returning to Poland, in 1924 he joined the Corps of Cadets No. 1 in Lviv, and in 1925 he passed his final exams at the st. Kazimierz Men's Gymnasium in Warsaw. Then he went to study in Paris. During this period, according to the memoirs of Aleksander Janta-Połczyński, he revealed his talent as an actor, but also as a conman.

After returning to Poland in 1929, thanks to the protection of the journalist Maria Jehanne Wielopolska, he landed a role in the film 9.25. Przygoda jednej nocy (9.25. One Night Adventure). To fit the lover character created there, he adopted the pseudonym Harry Cort. On the set he met the poet Jarosław Iwaszkiewicz, and started a romance (Iwaszkiewicz dedicated two poems to Cort: Pożar w atelier and Do S.B.). Soon afterwards, Bielski was involved in a moral scandal, seducing the wife of a bank director in 1930 and stealing her jewelry, which he then pawned (eventually escaping punishment). In 1932, he passed the acting exam and was admitted to Związek Artystów Scen Polskich (Union of Polish Stage Artists). e performed in the following theatres: Kameralny and 8:30 in Warsaw (1932) and the Grand Theater in Poznań (1933). In May 1933, the actor had a car accident when the vehicle he was driving crashed into a tree on the road near Murowana Goślina. He returned to acting after a month, appearing in revues and vaudevilles in Ciechocinek, Vilnius, Lviv and Kraków (collaborating with Jerzy Marr).

By May 1934 he was sent by his father to the family estate in San Remo - this stay was supposed to be a punishment for fraud and homosexual affairs. However, Bielski managed to escape from home and then seduce the daughter of an American millionaire, with whom he became engaged. Ultimately, the marriage did not take place, and the actor fell into a drug addiction. It was the reason for Bielski's arrest in 1935 in Paris - pressed by the French police who found trace amounts of cocaine and heroin on him, the artist gave names of his dealers, receiving only a fine of 300 francs. News about that arrest became a widely popular gossip in Polish press. It also impeded Witold Zdzitowiecki's planned film adaptation of The Picture of Dorian Gray, where Cort was to play the main role.

Over the next years Stanisław Bielski traveled around Europe, moving in social elite circles, where he used his princely title as a claim to higher spheres. From May to June 1939 he stayed in the United States, and then settled in London. There he met the Cuban Marquise Jeannine Marie de la Concepcion Renée de Giureoye. On August 1, 1939, the couple got married, with Prince George, Duke of Kent as a witness at the wedding.

The outbreak of World War II found the spouses in Switzerland. They returned to London, then via Madrid and Lisbon in August 1940 to New York. There, Bielski declared himself "a claimant to the Polish throne" and "chairman of an organization to help Dutch and Polish war victims in California." He lived lavishly and gave glossy interviews to the tabloid press. According to the documents, he was a member of the Polish military mission in Canada (1941–1943). In 1941, at the insistence of his wife, he invested his funds with his mother-in-law. Two years later, the wife left for Cuba, where she obtained a divorce from Bielski, also taking over his property. Until 1971, the actor sued his ex-wife to challenge the divorce, eventually losing the case, and the court costs ruined him financially.

In 1946 Bielski played an episodic role in The Razor's Edge, credited as „Stanislas Bielski”. In 1951, he was sentenced by a court to 180 days in prison for petty theft, vagrancy and "indecent sexual conduct". In 1968, he got involved in another court dispute, this time over a share in the inheritance of his late father (who disinherited Stanisław), eventually receiving a small amount from the sale of an estate in San Remo. He died in poverty and was buried at Saint Francis Catholic Cemetery in Phoenix.

== Filmography ==
- 9.25. Przygoda jednej nocy (1929) – traveler Lars
- Karuzela życia (1930) – journalist Jacek Trentkowski
- Halka (1930) – Janusz
- The Razor's Edge (1946) – man in the bar
