= Karol Benda =

Polish actor and director

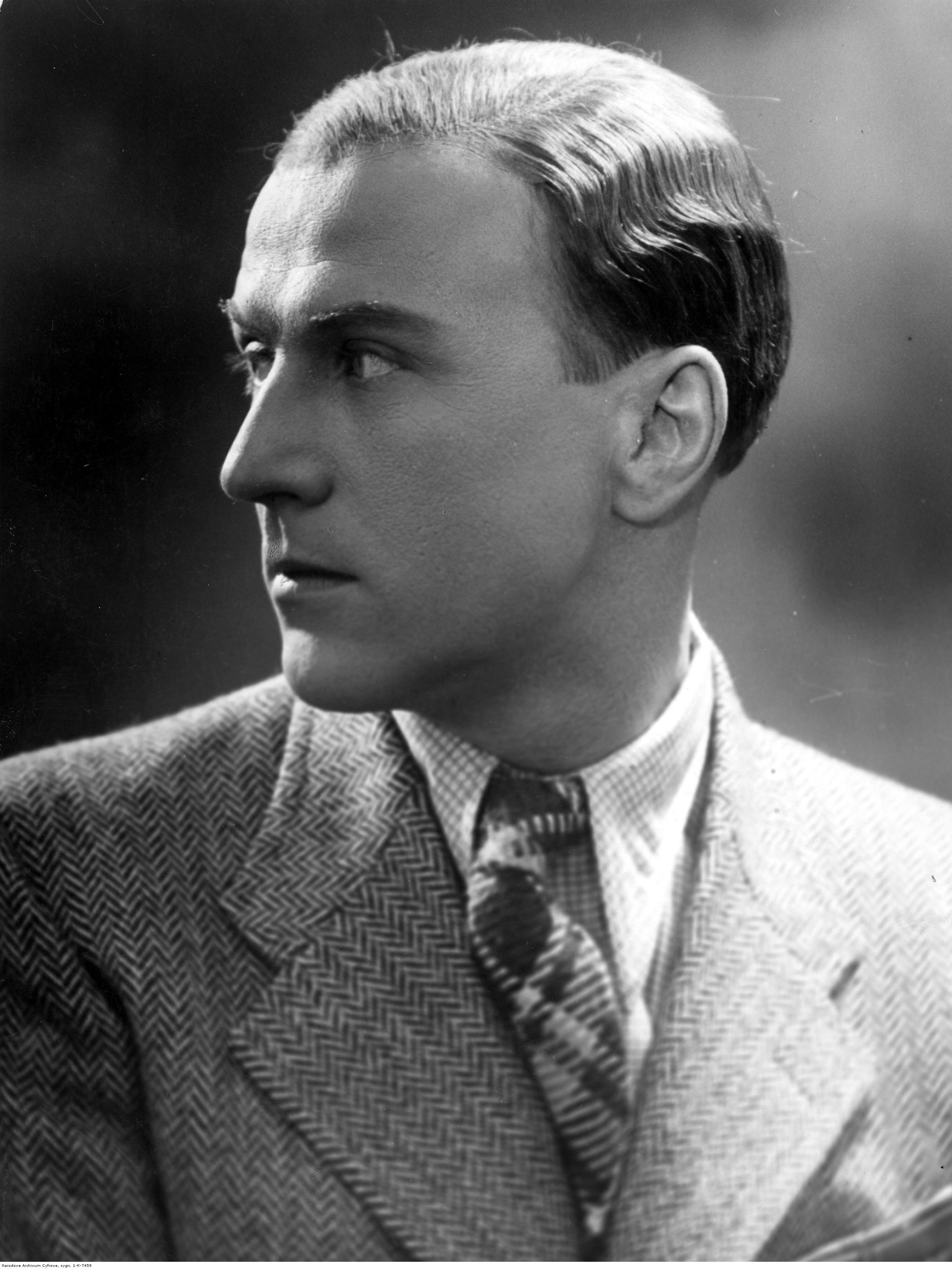
- Karol Benda between 1925 and 1926
- Born: Karol Spitzbarth; 17 February 1893; Warsaw
- Died: 25 August 1942 (aged 49); Warsaw
- Occupation(s): actor, director

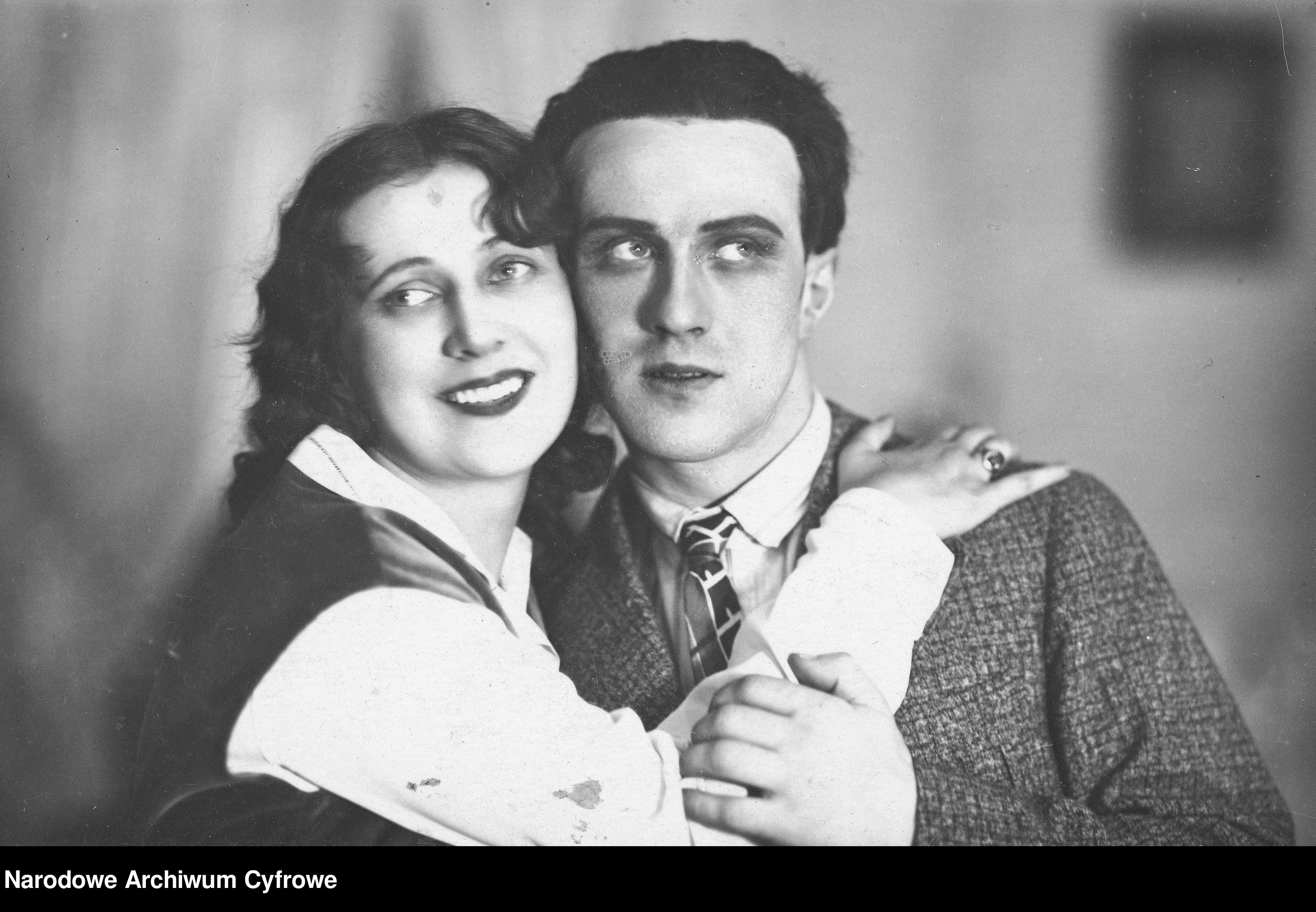
Maria Balcerkiewiczówna and Karol Benda performing in Dar poranka (Gift of the Morning) in Toruń Municipal Theatre

Karol Benda (born Karol Spitzbarth on 17 February 1893 in Warsaw; died 25 August 1942 in Warsaw) was a Polish theatre and film actor and director.

== Life ==
He was the son of the architect Artur Otto Spitzbarth and Aleksandra née Dunin-Borkowski; his brother was the architect Artur Jerzy Spitzbarth. He studied acting under Stanisław Stanisławski in Kraków. At the same time, he studied at the Jagiellonian University, and in December 1912 he appeared in the performance of the Academic Classical Drama Lovers.

He made his debut on 3 May 1913 under the name Karol Benda on the stage of the Juliusz Słowacki Theatre in the role of the Groom in Stanisław Wyspiański's The Wedding. The pseudonym he adopted at that time became a permanent stage name. In May 1915 he went to Vienna, where he played at the local Polish Theatre. After a year he returned to Krakow and during the 1916/1917 season he played at the Słowacki Theatre, and then left for Warsaw, where in the 1917/1918 season he was hired by the Polish Theatre. He spent the next season in Łódź, in order to play on the stages of Warsaw's City Theatres (Teatr Rozmaitości, Teatr Reduta, Teatr Dramatyczny) from February 1919 to 1924.

In 1924 he was appointed director of the Municipal Theatre in Toruń. The following year, initiating the merger of three stages of the cities of Toruń, Bydgoszcz and Grudziądz, in September he was appointed director of the United Pomeranian Theatres and founded the Toruń-Bydgoszcz-Grudziądz Pomeranian Opera of the United Theatres in Toruń. After resigning from his position in February 1926, he performed in the theatres of Grudziądz and Toruń.

After the 1928/1929 season, spent on the stage of Teatr Nowy in Poznań, he went to Paris, where he ran the amateur Polish Theatre. It was a stage showing the classic theatrical repertoire for the Polish diaspora living in France. He returned to Poland in 1930 and for two years he was the director of the Municipal Theatre in Toruń. In 1932 he returned to Warsaw, where he performed at the Stefan Żeromski Theatre (1932/1933), Gabriela Zapolska Theatre (1933/1934), and the Variety Theatre (1933/1934). In the season 1934/1935, together with Stefan Jaracz and Mira Zimińska, he managed the Actor's Theatre. He spent the next season on the stage of the Chamber Theatre (1935/1936), and the next season at the Malicka Theatre (1936/1937, 1937/1938 and 1938/1939), with a break in 1938 for operetta performances in the 8.15 Theatre.

From 1940 he performed and was a director in the German-controlled, legally operating Komedia Theatre. At the same time, however, he was engaged in the underground activity, printing the underground magazine "Głos Polski" in his apartment. On the night of 8–9 June 1940 the Nazis stormed the neighbouring house of Witold Zdzitowiecki (privately partner of Benda), looking for a Polish printing house. At that time, they tortured Benda and other people located there, but Zdzitowiecki managed to provide convincing false information, protecting the actual printing operation from discovery. In 1942, Benda died of a heart attack on stage, performing in the comedy production Kochanek to ja (The Lover is Me). He rests in the family tomb in the Evangelical-Augsburg cemetery (avenue A, grave 11).

== Bibliography ==
- Słownik biograficzny teatru polskiego (red. Z. Raszewski), Państwowe Wydawnictwo Naukowe, Warszawa 1973 p. 27
