= Municipal Theatre, Bydgoszcz =

Former theatre building in Bydgoszcz, Poland (1896–1946)

Former Municipal Theatre
- Polish: Teatr Miejski w Bydgoszczy
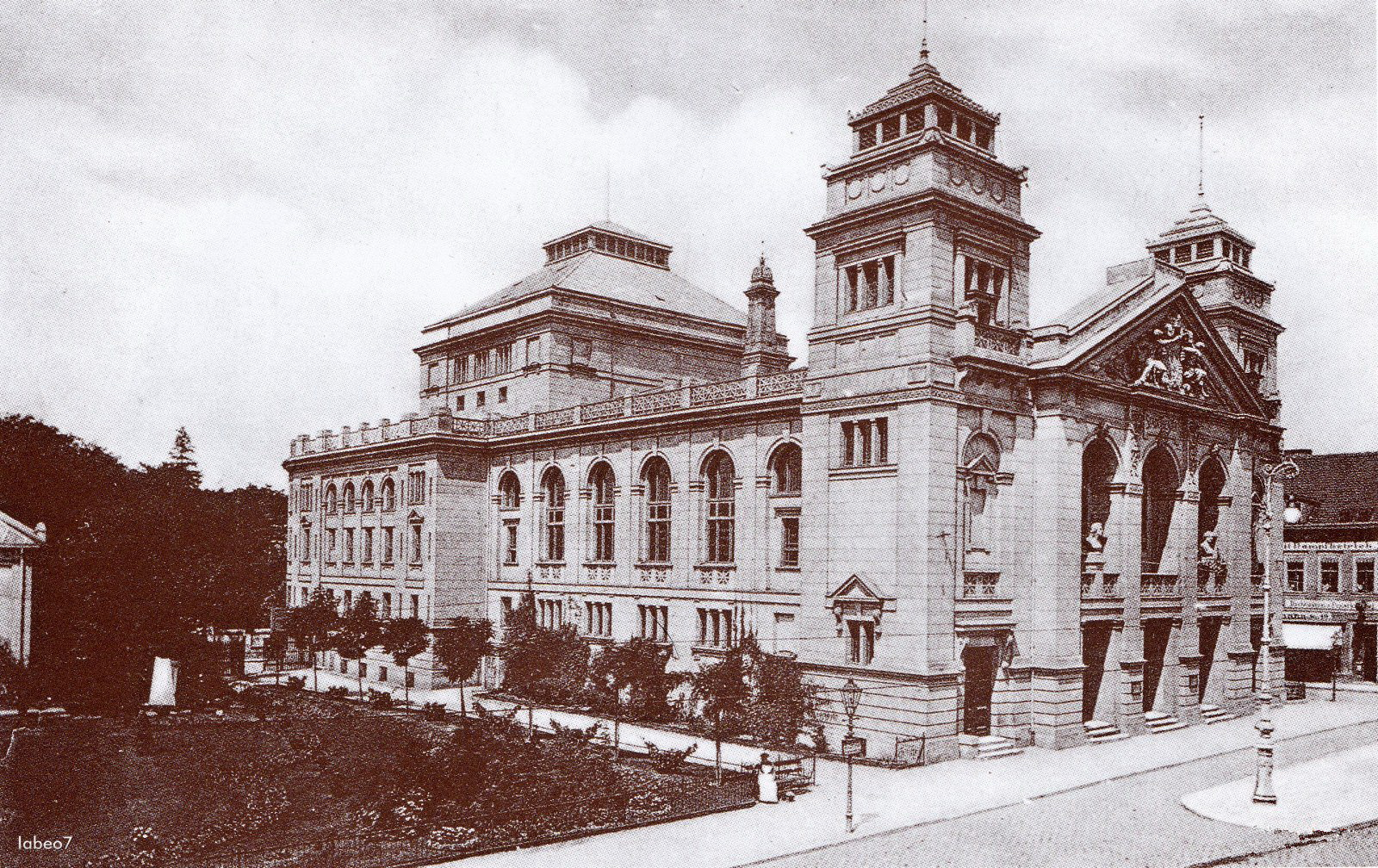
- View of the theatre from Theatre square in 1900
- Interactive map of the Former Municipal Theatre area

General information
- Architectural style: Historicism
- Location: Theatre square, Bromberg, Poland
- Coordinates: 53°7′30″N 17°59′13″E
- Construction started: 1895
- Completed: 1896
- Closed: 1945

Technical details
- Floor count: 3

Design and construction
- Architect: Heinrich Seeling

The Municipal Theatre of Bydgoszcz is a former theatre building which stood in Bydgoszcz, Poland from 1896 to 1946.

== Location ==
The building was located downtown, on the Theatre Square, along the Marshal Foch Street. It was a prestigious public building of the city, from late 19th to early 20th century.

== History ==
The history of the theater in Bydgoszcz dates back to the 17th century, when was built a special theatre hall in the city Jesuit College, able to accommodate approximately 300 people. Performances were played by students, on the occasion of church holidays, or for visits of dignitaries: kings, bishops, governors. The first permanent theater building in Bydgoszcz was built on the foundations of now gone St. Mary's Church of the Carmelites in 1824, on today's Theatre Square. The opening happened on September 3, 1824. The building was rebuilt twice after fires, on August 30, 1835 and March 24, 1890. The last restoration from 1895 to 1896, created a monumental representative, and was directed by Berlin architect and royal construction adviser Heinrich Christian Seeling. Seeling was recognized as a specialist in the construction of theaters in Germany: he built, among others, theaters in Halle, Stockholm, Essen (1890-1892), Berlin (1891-1892), Rostock (1894), Aachen (1901), Frankfurt (1902), Braunschweig (1904), Nuremberg (1905), Kiel (1908), Freiburg im Breisgau (1910), Charlottenburg (1911-1912). He developed the project and supervised the construction of the theater in Bydgoszcz, helped by city's construction engineer Carl Meyer. The building was designed for 800 seats, while remaining within the cost limits of 450 000 Deutsche Mark, and was completed by the end of 1896.

The first performance occurred on October 3, 1896, honored by the presence of German Emperor Wilhelm II. The theater building proved to have a successful and good location: it soon became a landmark in the city.

=== Prussian period (1895-1919) ===
At its beginnings, the theater staged off German art as one of the conditions for Prussian state financing the construction. The new theater building often attracted to Bromberg renowned European personnel. At the end of the 19th century, theater staff comprised 46 actors and 31 others (maintenance men, office managers, musicians). Famous playwrights were staged off: Goethe, Schiller, Shakespeare, Kleist, Calderon, Hauptmann, Ibsen, Victorien Sardou and others. Performances included tragedy, comedy, farce but also musical arts: opera (e.g. Richard Wagner), operetta, concerts by performers such as Richard Strauss (1899), Milan La Scala's orchestra (1899) or Eduard Strauss (1899, 1900).

=== Polish Period (1920-1939) ===
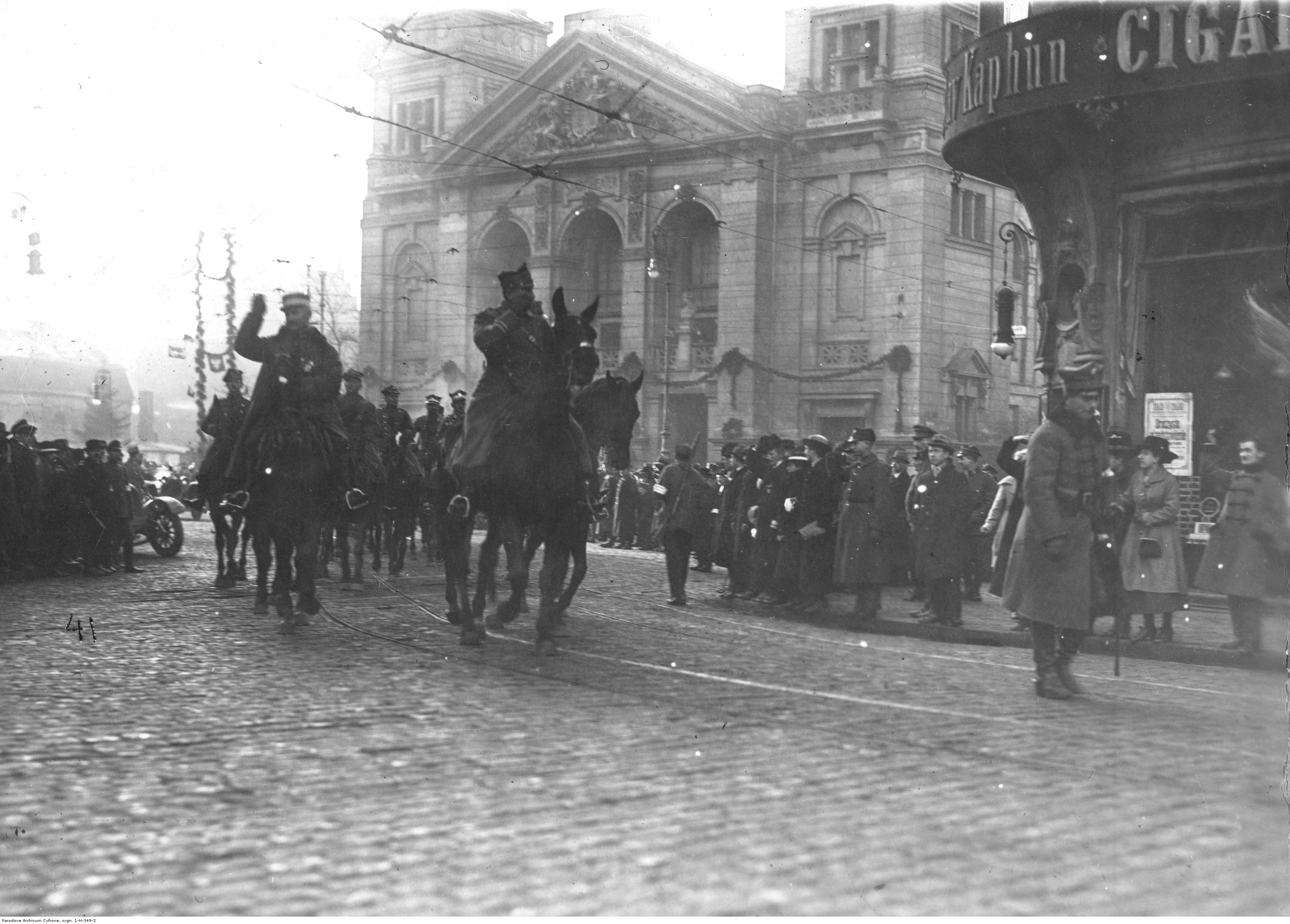
General Józef Dowbor-Muśnicki entering Bydgoszcz (Teatralny Square) on 20th January 1920.

During the interwar era, the Municipal Theatre was the most important cultural institution in the city. The first Polish presentation took place on December 5, 1919, while director was Ludwik Dybizbański. Following directors were \:

- the actress Wanda Siemaszkowa,
- Józef Karbowski,
- Karol Benda,
- Władysław Stoma.

The latter led in 1937 the theatre to its most heyday, when most prominent Polish actors performed in Bydgoszcz. This year, the number of theatrical performances exceeded 350 performances and exposed not only dramatic arts, but also performances including operas, operettas and revues. At that time, the scene starred, among others, Ludwik Solski, Stefan Jaracz, Mieczysława Ćwiklińska, Kazimierz Junosza-Stępowski, Stanisława Wysocka and Hanka Ordonówna. The last Polish director was Alexander Rodziewicz.

The success of the theater led to new investments. In 1921, a refurbishment of the interior was realized, including a new Front curtain, and in 1937, the scene received a revolving stage and a parking lot was built near the front entrance. In 1936, the first broadcast studio of the "Polskie Radio Pomorza i Kujaw" (Radio PiK) (English: Polish Radio of Kujawsko-Pomorskie), a local branch of the national network, started to operate from one the theatre hall. On January 4, 1937, city mayor Leon Barciszewski performed from the building a speech, broadcast live by the nascent Radio PiK. A year later, the theater was named after Karol Hubert Rostworowski.

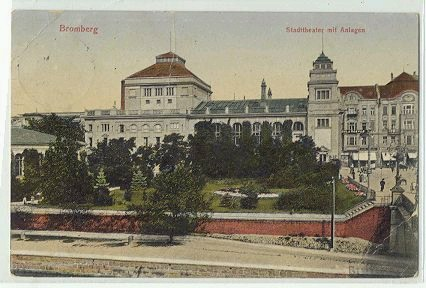
View of the building from the Brda river

=== Occupation period (1939-1945) ===
During World War II, new German actors arrived from Riga, relocated to Bydgoszcz, following the Molotov–Ribbentrop Pact. At that time performances were rather intimate, the 1943/44 season, staging puppets scene. After the proclamation of the total war, the theatre was closed for the 1944-1945 season.

=== Destruction of the building (1945-1946) ===
In 1945, during the fighting for the liberation of the city, the theatre building was hit by incendiary ammunitions, which set fire to the inside, where Soviet soldiers were billeted. The decision was then made to tear down the Municipal Theater, instead of restoring it. Eventually, demolition happened in spring 1946, and lawn planted where the theatre stood. The new theatre, Polish Theatre in Bydgoszcz (Polish: Teatr Polski w Bydgoszczy), more modest in its architecture was built a few years later (1948-1949) in Adam Mickiewicz Alley. It was the first theater building realized in Poland since the end of World War II. The choice of the new location was due to the presence of a former German theatre, "Elysium" in Gdańska Street: the project was officially an extension of this facility, hence getting more easily the approval of the Ministry of Culture and Art.

== Architecture ==
Interiors of the Municipal Theatre consisted of two areas: one devoted to the auditorium, one for the scene, along with a number of auxiliary rooms. The main entrance led to a vestibule, transitioning to staircases. Internal stairs led to the first floor, while the side towers housed stairs leading to the second floor and balconies. Both on the ground floor and on the first floor were extensive foyers. Maximal capacity of the theater was 800 spectators (777 seats).

Distribution of seats of the auditorium were as follows:

- Ground floor - 333 places arranged as an amphitheater;
- Lower balcony - 163 seats;
- Back of the auditorium - 117 seats;
- Upper balcony - 116 seats;
- Balcony gallery - 70 seats.

German designer Ernst Westphal took part in the interior decoration, including the suspension of a huge crystal chandelier. Foyers displayed also rich details, like marble floors, crystal lustres and decorative Argand lamps.

The facades featured historicism and eclecticism styles, referring to modern neoclassicism. An innovative solution was to build two towers, flanking the entrance portal. Sculptures of Goethe and Schiller were placed in the recesses of the second storey of the facade. The elevation was crowned by a triangular pediment, with a Tympanum (architecture) which displayed a sculpture from Ernst Westphal: the Prussian eagle holding in its claws Bromberg coat of arms, surrounded by allegorical characters.

Along the Brda river, a restaurant called Teatralna opened, with a square giving onto the river bank. In this green area the statue The Archer (Polish: Łuczniczka) by Ferdinand Lepcke was unveiled in 1910. Today it has moved in the Jan Kochanowski Park, nearby Adam Mickiewicz Alley and is considered as one of the symbols of Bydgoszcz.

== Gallery ==
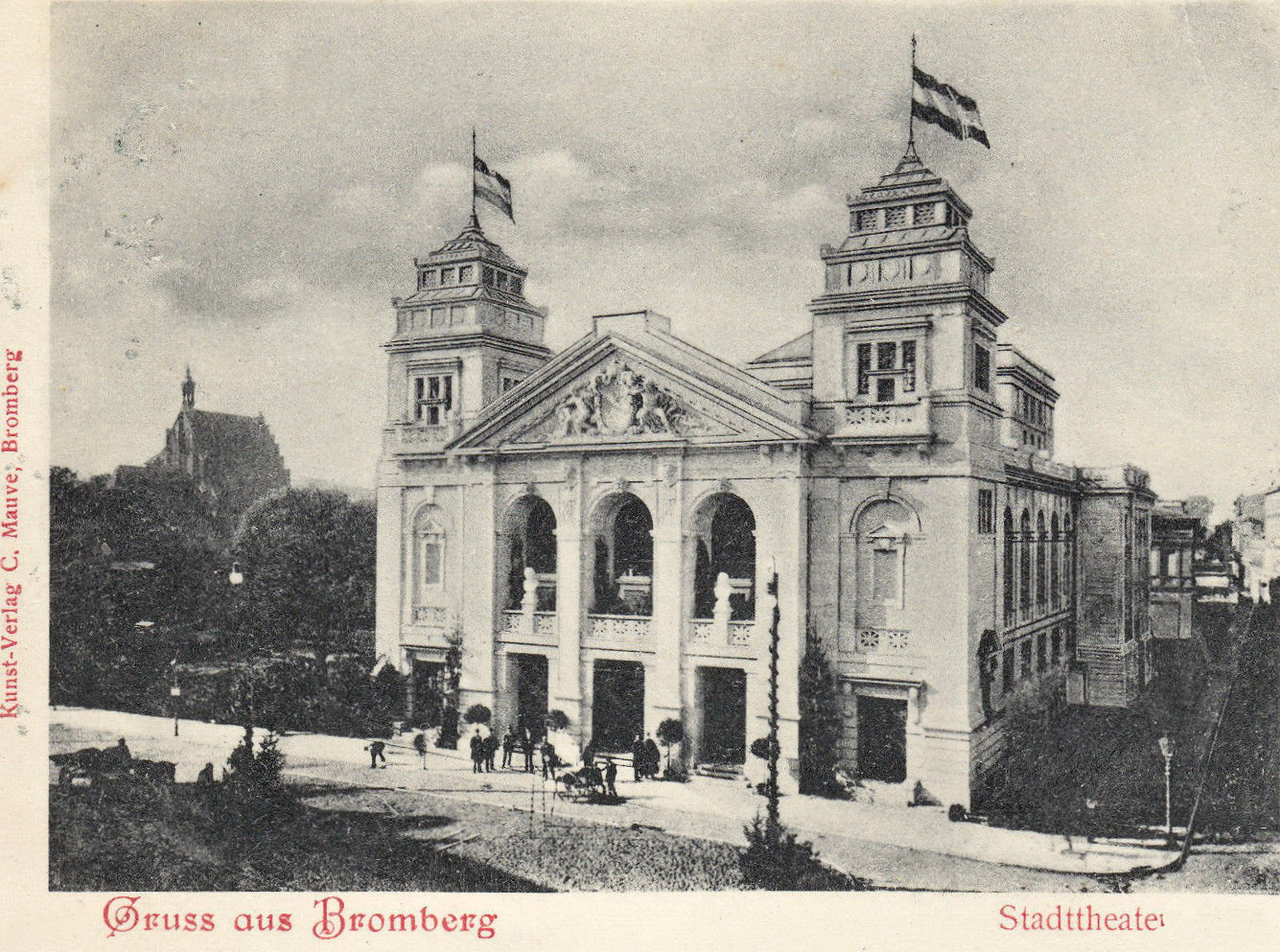
Main facade, 1905

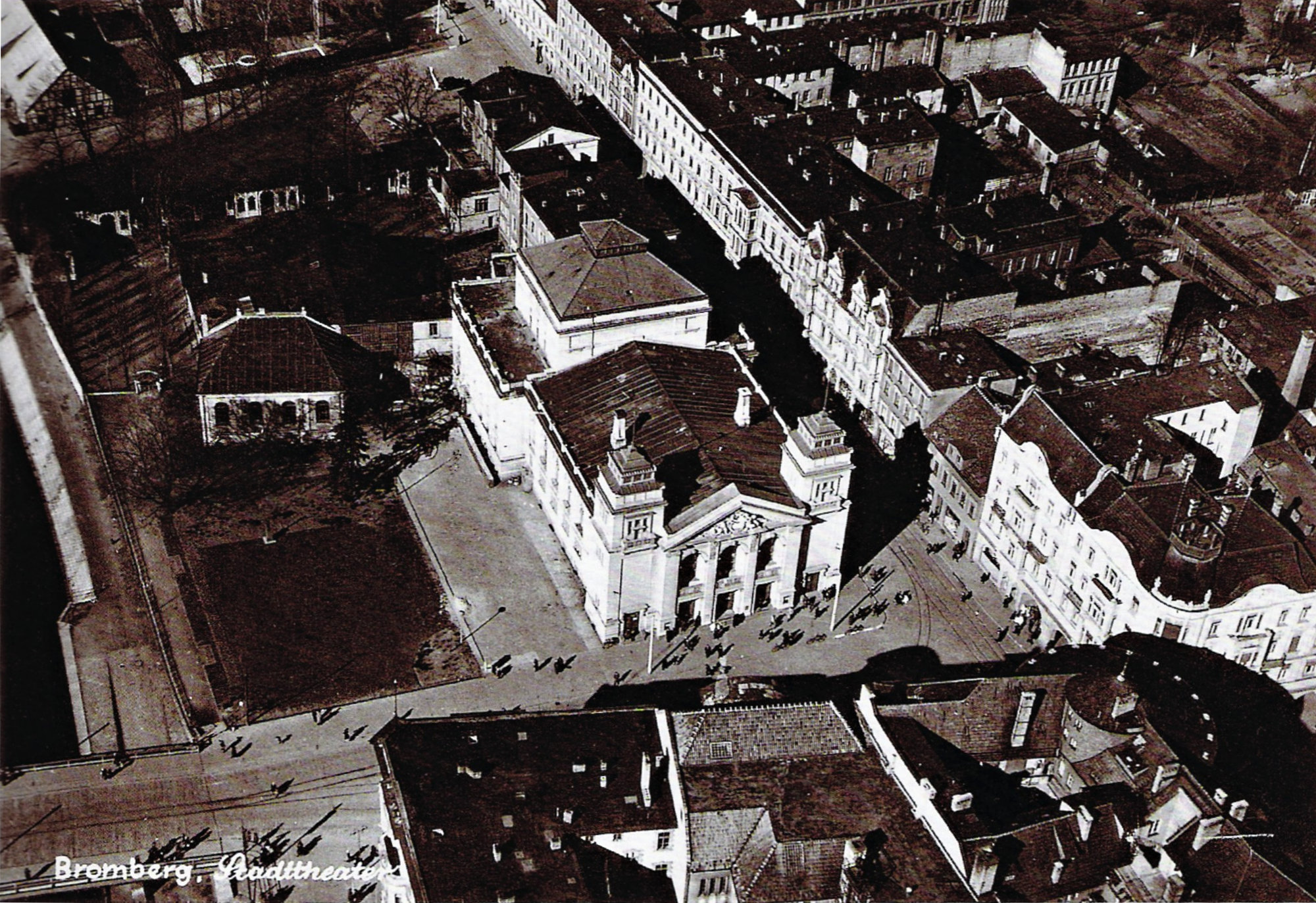
Bird eye view in the 1910s

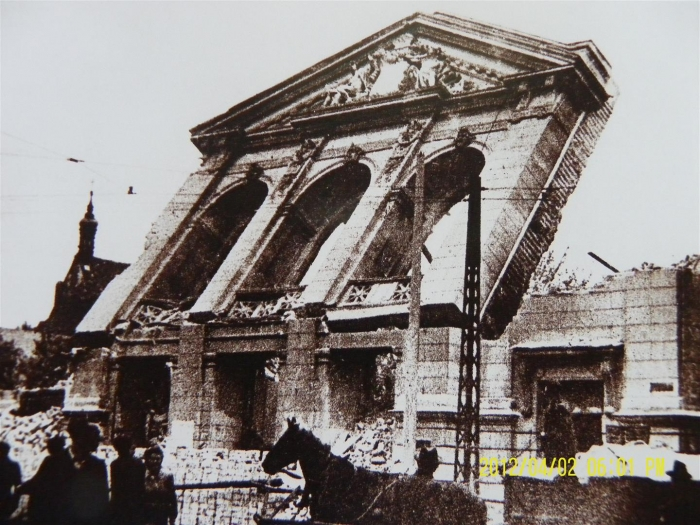
Theatre demolition in 1946

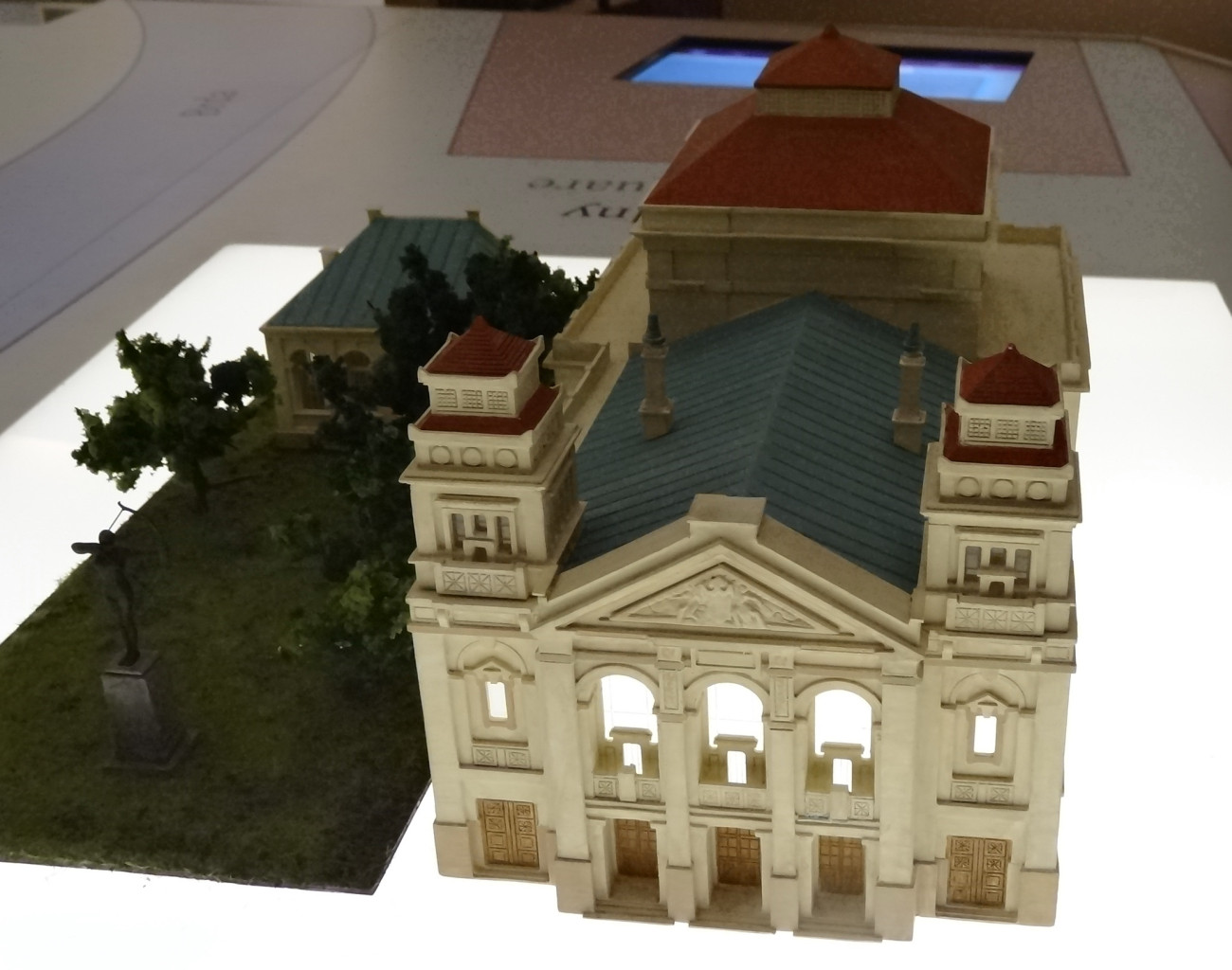
Mock-up of the Theatre and its square

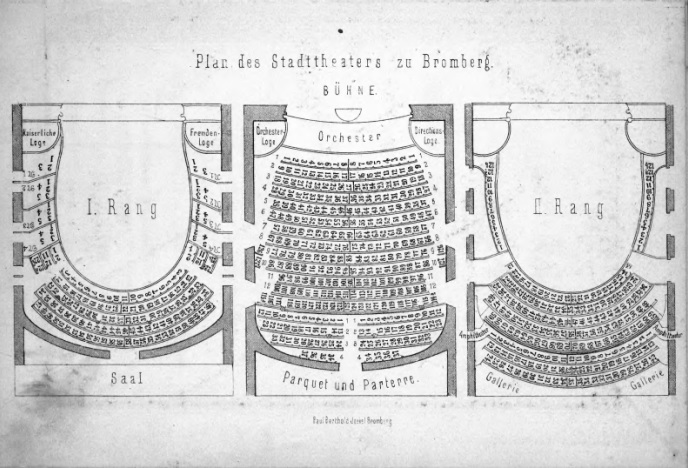
Interiors map

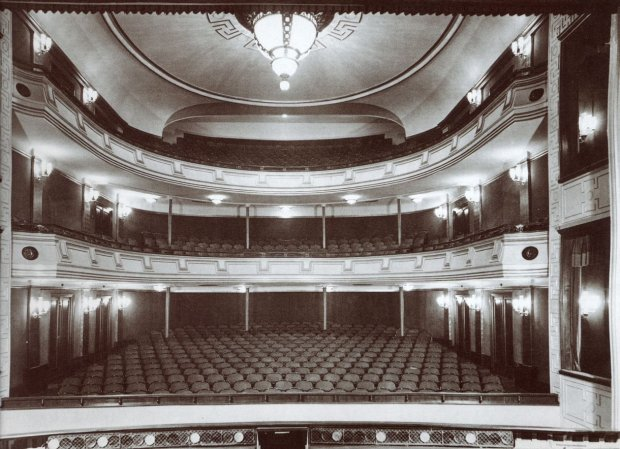
View of the auditorium, 1946

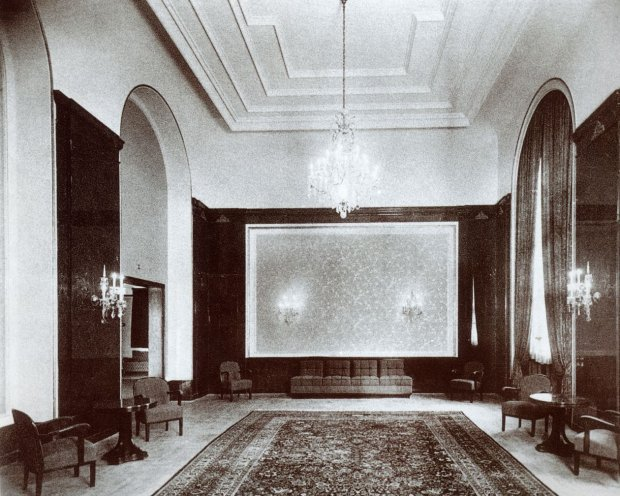
Foyer, 1946

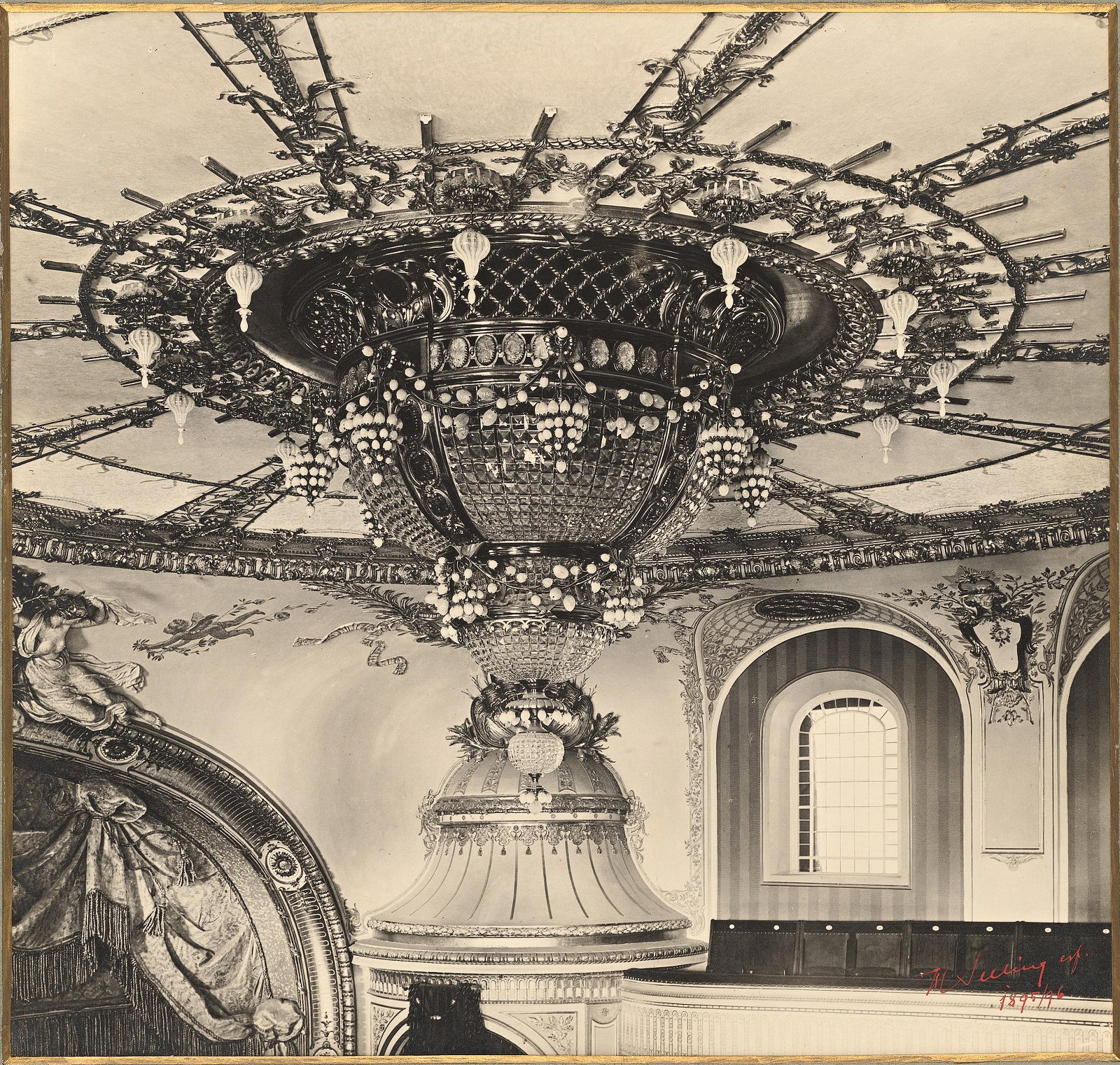
Grand chandelier

== See also ==
- Bydgoszcz
- Theatre square in Bydgoszcz
- Marshal Ferdinand Foch Street in Bydgoszcz
- Heinrich Seeling
- Gdańska Street, Bydgoszcz
- Grodzka Street in Bydgoszcz
- Mill Island in Bydgoszcz

== Bibliography ==
- (in Polish) Biskup, Marian (1991). Historia Bydgoszczy. Tom I do roku 1920. Warszawa-Poznań: Bydgoskie Towarzystwo Naukowe.
- (in Polish) Bręczewska-Kulesza, Daria (1999). Bydgoskie realizacje Heinricha Seelinga. Materiały do dziejów kultury i sztuki Bydgoszczy i regionu: zeszyt 4. Bydgoszcz: Pracownia dokumentacji i popularyzacji zabytków wojewódzkiego ośrodka kultury w Bydgoszczy.
- (in Polish) Derenda, Jerzy (2006). Piękna stara Bydgoszcz – tom I z serii Bydgoszcz miasto na Kujawach. Bydgoszcz: Towarzystwo Miłośników Miasta Bydgoszczy.
- (in Polish) Janiszewska-Mincer, Barbara (1986). Bydgoskie siedziby Melpomeny i Talii. Kalendarz Bydgoski. Bydgoszcz: Towarzystwo Miłośników Miasta Bydgoszczy. pp. 72–75.
- (in Polish) Janiszewska-Mincer, Barbara (1981). Wybitna aktorka i kłopoty z Teatrem Miejskim w Bydgoszczy. Kalendarz Bydgoski. Bydgoszcz: Towarzystwo Miłośników Miasta Bydgoszczy. pp. 109–112.
- (in Polish) Mrozek, Zdzisław (1993). Z tradycji teatralnych Bydgoszczy (do 1918 r.). Kalendarz Bydgoski. Bydgoszcz: Towarzystwo Miłosnikow Miasta Bydgoszczy. pp. 87–94.
- (in Polish) Oleradzka, Jadwiga (1991). Teatr Polski w Bydgoszczy 1920-1990. Kronika Bydgoska XI. Towarzystwo Miłosnikow Miasta Bydgoszczy - Bydgoskie Towarzystwo Naukowe. pp. 9–36.
- (in Polish) Sucharska, Anna (1983). Bydgoski Teatr Miejski w latach międzywojennych. Kalendarz Bydgoski. Bydgoszcz: Towarzystwo Miłosnikow Miasta Bydgoszczy. pp. 93–97.
- (in Polish) Umiński, Janusz (1996). Bydgoszcz. Przewodnik. Bydgoszcz: Regionalny Oddział PTTK "Szlak Brdy".
