= Halka (1930 film) =

- Directed by: Konstanty Meglicki
- Written by: Jerzy Braun
- Starring: Zorika Szymańska; Harry Cort; Włodzimierz Czerski
- Cinematography: Hans Androschin
- Production company: Wir-Film
- Release date: 2 January 1930
- Running time: 1 hour, 7 minutes
- Country: Poland
- Language: Polish

Halka is a 1930 Polish musical film directed by Konstanty Meglicki and starring Zorika Szymańska and Harry Cort. It is a loose adaptation of the 1848 opera Halka composed by Stanisław Moniuszko with a libretto by Włodzimierz Wolski.

== Details ==
One of the three Polish pre-war film adaptations of Stanisław Moniuszko's opera (the others being Halka from 1913 and Halka from 1937). The film was initially silent, being shot at the end of the silent film era. It was shown in cinemas with a "musical illustration" recorded on gramophone records. In 1932, the film was "permanently" voiced. Jontek's arias were sung by Władysław Ladis-Kiepura (Jan Kiepura's younger brother), Halka's by Zuzanna Karin, collective parts performed by a team of artists from the Warsaw Opera.

Outdoor shots were taken, among others, in Czorsztyn.

The film was not known to post-war audiences. Only the final excerpt from the original, silent version was in circulation. The collection of the Filmoteka Narodowa (Polish National Film Archive) has preserved many fragments of materials for the sound version from 1932 (cropped image negatives, sound negatives, sound rejects, working copies), but their condition did not allow exploitation for decades. Thanks to modern digital technology, the film was digitally reconstructed.

== Main cast ==
- Zorika Szymańska (Halka),
- Harry Cort (Janusz),
- Helena Zahorska (Janusz' mother),
- Włodzimierz Czerski (Jontek),
- Zofia Lindorfówna (Zosia),
- Marian Palewicz (Pantler),
- Henryk Kowalski (Dzimba),
- Konstanty Meglicki (grandpa),
- Franciszek Petersile
