= Grand Theatre, Poznań =

Opera house in Poznań, Poland

Coordinates: 52°24′36″N 16°55′03″E

Grand Theatre
- Teatr Wielki im. Stanisława Moniuszki (in Polish)
- Teatr Miejski; Teatr Wielki
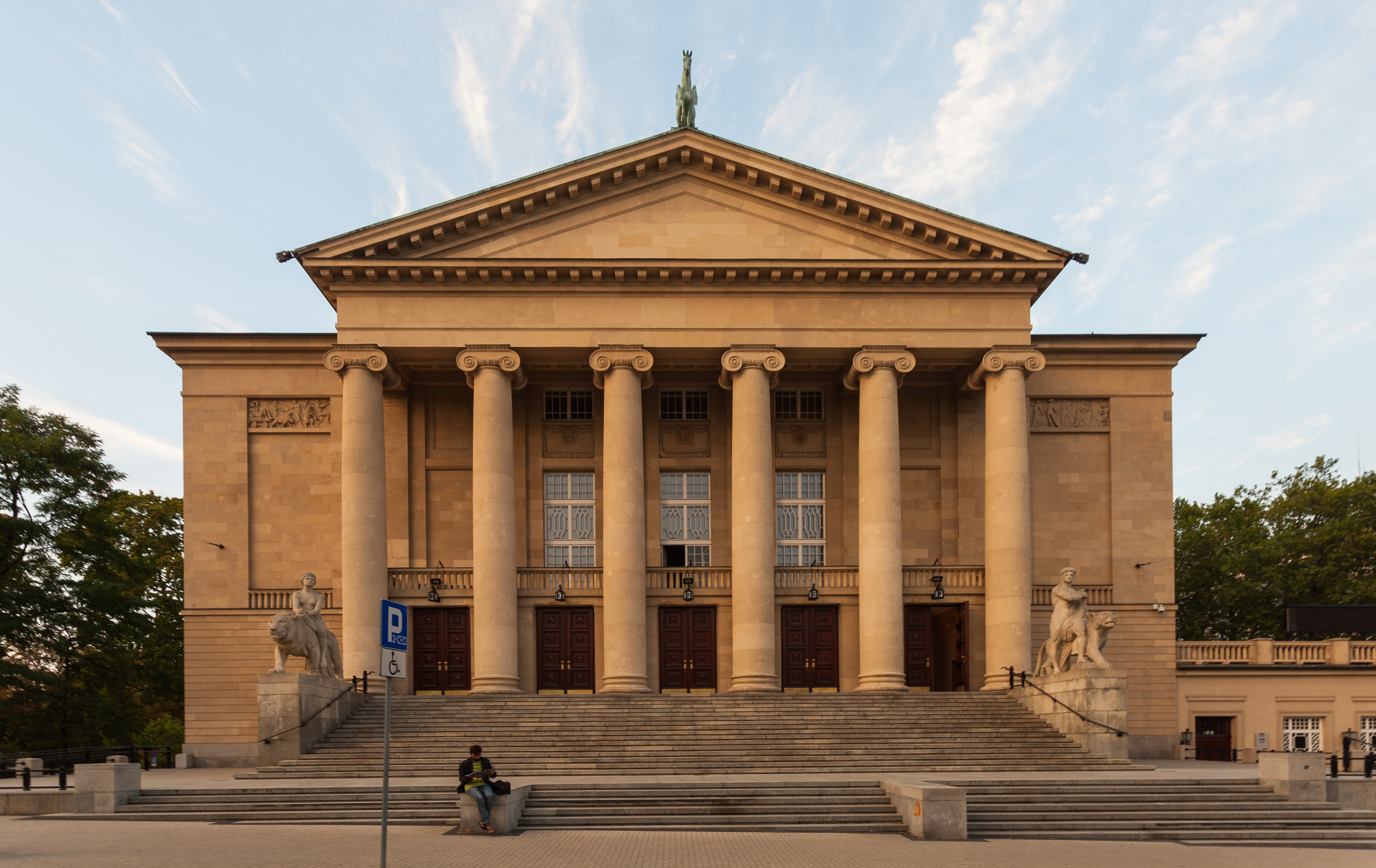
- Interactive map of Grand Theatre
- Address: 9 Aleksandra Fredry; Poznań; Poland
- Type: Opera house

Construction
- Opened: 1910
- Years active: 1910-present
- Architect: Max Littmann

Website
- http://www.opera.poznan.pl/

Grand Theatre, Poznań (Polish: Teatr Wielki im. Stanisława Moniuszki w Poznaniu) is a neoclassical opera house located in Poznań, Poland. It is named after famous Polish composer Stanisław Moniuszko.

== History ==
Designed by German architect Max Littmann, named German City Theatre (Deutsches Stadttheater) and inaugurated in 1910 in the Province of Posen with The Magic Flute (Wolfgang Amadeus Mozart), the Grand Theatre in Poznań is a main opera stage in Greater Poland Voivodeship currently directed by Michał Znaniecki.

Its season runs from mid-September to mid-June and the company mounts an annual "Festival Verdi" in October and "E. T. A. Hoffmann Festival" in April, often with special guests.
