= Mill Island, Bydgoszcz =

City park in Bydgoszcz, Poland

Mill Island
Bydgoszcz
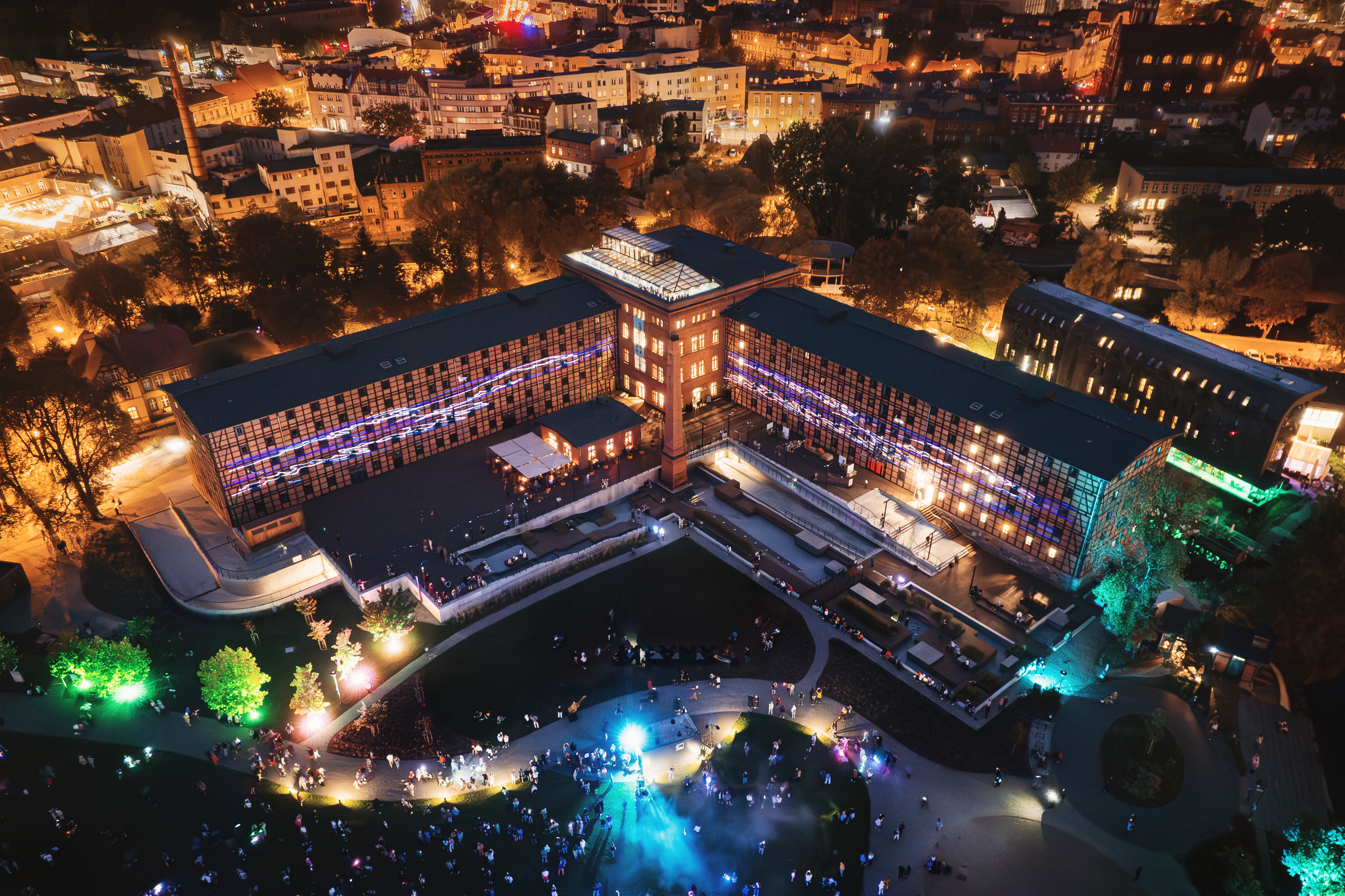
- Mill Island Bydgoszcz bird's-eye view

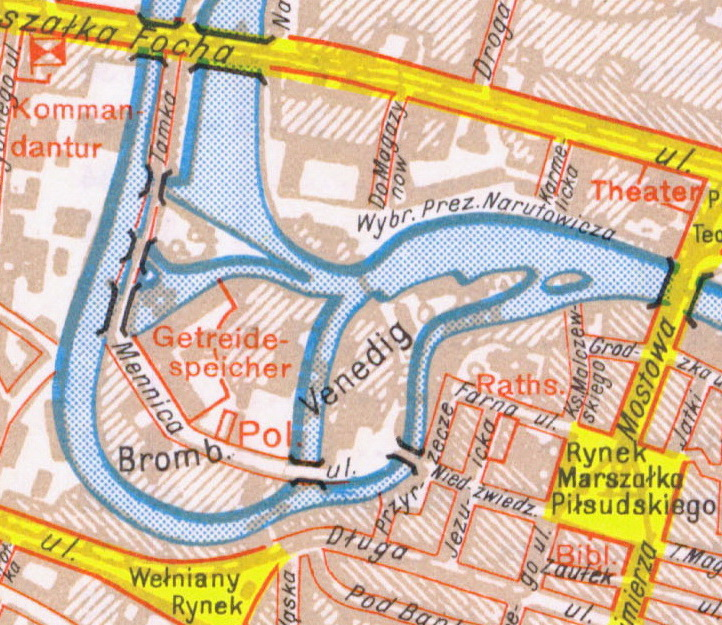
- Mill Island location on a 1939 map
- Native name: Wyspa Młyńska w Bydgoszczy (Polish)
- Type: Island
- Owner: City of Bydgoszcz
- Area: 6.5 ha (16 acres)
- Location: Bydgoszcz, Poland
- Coordinates: 53°7′20″N 17°59′45″E

Mill Island (Polish: Wyspa Młyńska) is a historic area in the Old Town of Bydgoszcz, Poland. It covers approximately 6.5 ha and today is a place with cultural and recreational facilities, surrounded by the Brda river and its branch. The island received the 2012 certificate for Best Tourist Attraction from the Polish Tourist Organisation.

== Location ==
The island is situated between the Brda river and its leat branch, west of the Old Market, in Bydgoszcz Old Town. Only one road runs through the island, Mennica Street, whose name derives from Polish mennica 'mint': a royal mint demolished in the 19th century operated there from 1594 to 1688. Mennica street connects the Old Market to the mills on the island, and extends to Foch Street, running along the causeway connecting Mill Island with water locks.

== Characteristics ==
Mill Island is one of the most beautiful scenic spots in Bydgoszcz, thanks to its picturesque features: long waterfronts, locks and dams, canal waterfall, greenery and buildings frontages on waterfront (nicknamed "Venice of Bydgoszcz"). Its location in the Old Town district is a symbol of the close symbiosis between Bydgoszcz city and the river-and-canals network, the Bydgoszcz Floodway ((in Polish) "Bydgoszcz Węzeł Wodny" connecting Vistula and Oder rivers. Nowadays, the island is a recreation and culture place, thanks to the presence of numerous museums and the proximity of city Opera ("Opera Nova").

Island intersected two canals:

- The "Międzywodzie (between waters) kanal", a historic watercourse, renovated in 2007;
- The "Grain channel", west of Rother's Mills, pierced in the 18th century.

The leat river flows around the island and joins the Brda river through two weirs, "Jaz Farny" and "Jaz Ulgowy", and a fish ladder.

Today, the island is connected to the rest of the city with pedestrian bridges and one bridge for vehicles. A meadow stands in the middle of the island, with an amphitheatre facing the river and a playground for children. In the east, the "Międzywodzie kanal" makes delimitation with the so-called "Mint Island", home to several facilities of the District Museum:

- The "White Granary", with its Gothic cross-vaulted cellar from the 15th century holds archaeological collections;
- A house from the late 18th or early 19th century housed the "European Money Centre", with exhibitions relating to Bydgoszcz's mint and money in Europe;
- The "Red Granary" holds a Gallery of Modern Art with a former miller's house as its reception and information center;
- Leon Wyczolkowski's house in the central part of the island exhibits the achievements of the artist.

A dike separates the north-western part of the Mill Island from the Brda: in this area is set a waterfront mooring for yachts, along with a marina and a hotel, at the opposite of Rother's Mills.

The island is connected to the Opera with a pedestrian bridge: its landing has an observation deck and an amphitheater, used to for outdoor performances. On Mill Island, a pedestal carrying an earthly globe identifies the 18° East Meridian, which crosses the neighboring Old Market. Near the waterfront is a 700 m^{2} sandy area filled with sea sand coming from Miedzyzdroje.

Every year in June, takes place there Bydgoszcz's Water Festival, aiming at popularizing E70 waterway and inland waterways tourism.

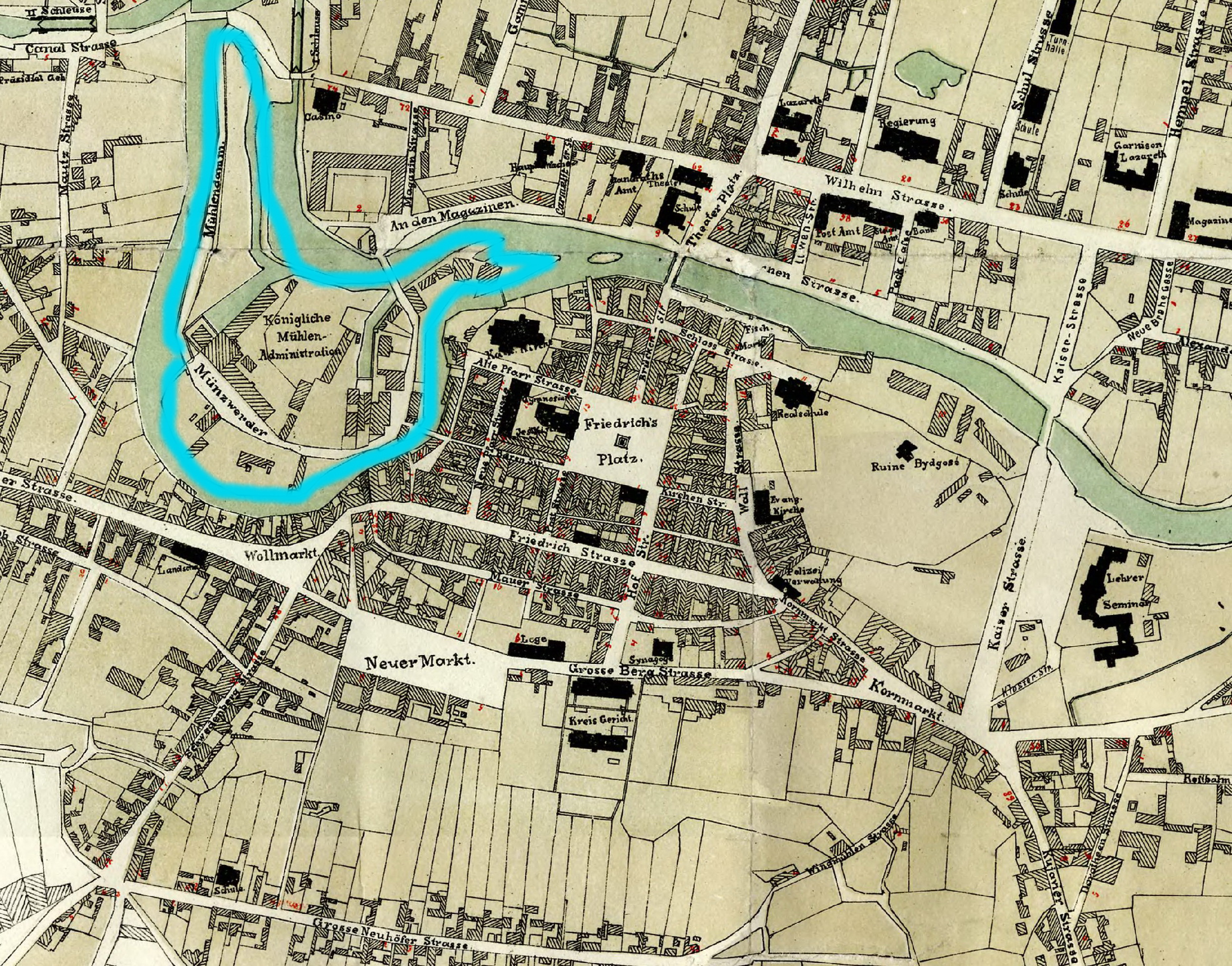
Mill Island on an 1876 map of Bromberg/Bydgoszcz

== History ==
Historically, the island comprised three earth lands:

- The Northern island, dismantled with the construction of Bydgoszcz Canal in 1772–1774;
- The Western island, now the central part of current Mill Island;
- The Eastern (mint) island, where was established in 1594 one of the most important mint house in the early modern era of Poland, coins from Bydgoszcz Mint being known all over Europe.

The "Eastern island" and western part of "Międzywodzie kanal" have been buried during the 1960s and recreated in the form of a cascade in 2007.

=== Old Polish Period (until the mid-18th century) ===
For several centuries, the Mill Island was part of royal domain, hence its old Polish name "Royal Island" (Wyspa Królewska), or sometimes "Okole". Actual name Mill Island comes from several mills that were built on the island since the 14th century, which gained a peak of activityin the 19th century.

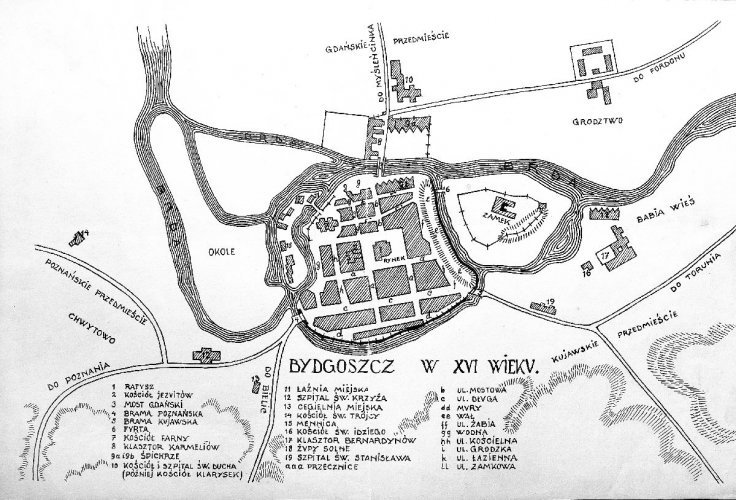
Estimated footprint of Bydgoszcz in 16th century

In the Middle Ages, first mills appeared on the eastern part of the island. At the end of the 14th century, for economical and military defense purposes, water network in the western Old Town was improved, so as to take advantage of Brda river first weir, Jaz Farny (literally "Parish weir"), has been created, along with a lock and a navigable channel which is today the actual riverbed of the Brda. Around 1400, opposite Bydgoszcz Cathedral has been built the mill of the church (młyn kościelny). At the time, royal mills belonging to Bydgoszcz starosta, were standing at the junction of the "Międzywodzie kanal" and the leat channel. In 1541, several large five-wheel driven mills and a sawmill were working on the island. In addition to corn and malt mills, there were also fulling mills for wool cleansing and leather tanning.

The western Island, less built, was occupied by gardens.

In 1594, on the eastern island has been established the Bydgoszcz Mint, propriety of King Sigismund III Vasa. His favourite, Stanisław Cikowski, opened there a private mint, which turned into a royal mint in the early 17th century.

=== Prussian period (1772–1920) ===
The most significant transformation of the island dates back to the construction of the Bydgoszcz Canal. In 1774, in the area of the mint house, was built the largest watermill called "Hercules" (nicknamed "Henryk" from 1828). The last remaining building in Mennica Street (at no. 4) was a tannery, established in 1760 south of the sawmill, and in 1789 were built half-timbered granaries called the White Granary. In addition to industrial and warehouse buildings, residential buildings appeared, like the Miller's House (at Mennica St. no. 8) in 1772 or the Administration mills building (no. 6) in the end of the 18th century). To ease the management of cereals between military warehouses on left bank of Brda river and the island, was built in 1789 the "Warehouse bridge" (now at the level of the pedestrian bridge to Opera Nova).

Between 1815 and 1825, Prussians authorities under the leadership of attorney Koplin, started the reconstruction of the island. They piled the dike linking the island to Focha Street, built a complex of mills, barns (including the predecessor of the Red Granary) and residential buildings, in particular using the foundations of the former mint house. On the northern edge of the island were built "Rudolf and Wilhelm Mills" (now Bydgoszcz hydroelectric power station "Kujawska"), a brick coach-house and storage facilities. In 1816 was built a wooden bridge, the Mill Bridge, connecting to the Old Market Square (now Ku Młynom Street).

In 1825, all facilities on Mill Island were taken over by a consortium, comprising, among others, the Schickler brothers from Berlin. These brothers owned also in Bydgoszcz, raised on the grounds of the former castle, a sugar refinery (now the local seat of PZU insurance company at Grodzka St.25). The Schicklers' set up in 1826 Bydgoszcz Mills Company "Hercules", producing not only the local market but also exporting to Germany, Great Britain, and even Brazil. "Hercules" facilities processed cereals imported by water from the whole Polish Kingdom. The mills were also equipped with a waterwheels-driven sawmill.

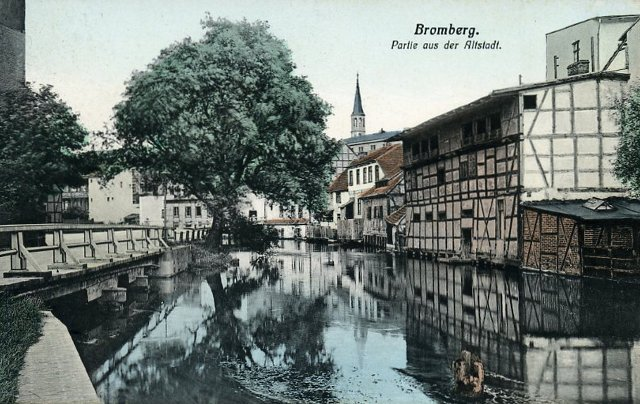
"Bydgoszcz Venice" on a Prussian postcard

In 1842, the consortium took over Prussian owned facilities: in 1846 Royal Mills pioneered the first steam engine in Bydgoszcz. In 1848 and 1849, the old mills were demolished, and in its place were built a large mill complex, now known as the Rother's Mills: they were the largest mills in Bydgoszcz in the second half of the 19th century and were supported by smaller ones throughout Bydgoszcz, like "Kentzer Mills", now hotel "Słoneczny Młyn".

In 1859, "Henryk" watermill was demolished, giving place to a steam mill "Camphausa" (the current Red Barn). In 1899, a residential villa was built on the island for members of the board mills (at Minneca no. 7), now Leon Wyczolkowski's house. At the turn of the 20th century, the transition from water power mills to steam and electricity industrial buildings on the island was almost complete.

In addition, the period from 1870 to 1914 was the time of creation of "Bydgoszcz Venice", an architectural ensemble of tenements built along the leat canal of the river from the east, south and west. Those picturesque buildings down to the foot of the river became a tourist attraction and inspiration for artists.

=== Interwar period (1920–1930) ===
During interwar years, slight changes were brought to the island settlements.

In 1936, a marina for the Military Sports Club was created: demolished in 2011, it has been reconstructed in a new form a year later. In 1934, the "Warehouse bridge" connecting military warehouses to the city was demolished, due to the bend expansion of the Brda river.

=== Post-war period (since 1945) ===
After World War II, all milling facilities on the island became property of the "Grain and Mills State Enterprises". Marina was expanded to the benefit of WKS "Zawisza" Sports Club and water police station in the area of the White Granary. In 1964, the Mill Bridge was rebuilt in the current form. At the end of the 1960s, two water ways were filled in, the "Międzywodzie kanal" and the Grain Channel (partly) allowing the island to be merged into one.

In 1978 on the island has been placed a MiG-15, as a monument, which stood here a few months. In the 1980s, an artillery canon has been also placed here.

First revitalization plans for Mill Island in the 1970s were aimed to transform mill installations into museums. In the 1990s mills were sold to private investors, and the remaining facilities were transferred to the ownership of "Leon Wyczółkowski" District Museum in Bydgoszcz.

Revitalization of Mill Island came to completion only after 2004, once received specific funds European Union and European Economic Area. Comprehensive work has been done from 2006 to 2010, with the erection in 2012 of a new water marina in place of the existing WKS "Zawisza" one.

In 2022, Rother's Mills ensemble has been transformed into an exhibition area. Furthermore, since June 2, 2022, the city of Bydgoszcz has been putting Józef Makowski's sculptures into display on the northern waterfront of the island. These stone fishes statues used to stand in the 1950s, in a pool to replace the downtown monumental fountain "The Deluge" (Polish: Potop), melted down by German forces in 1942.

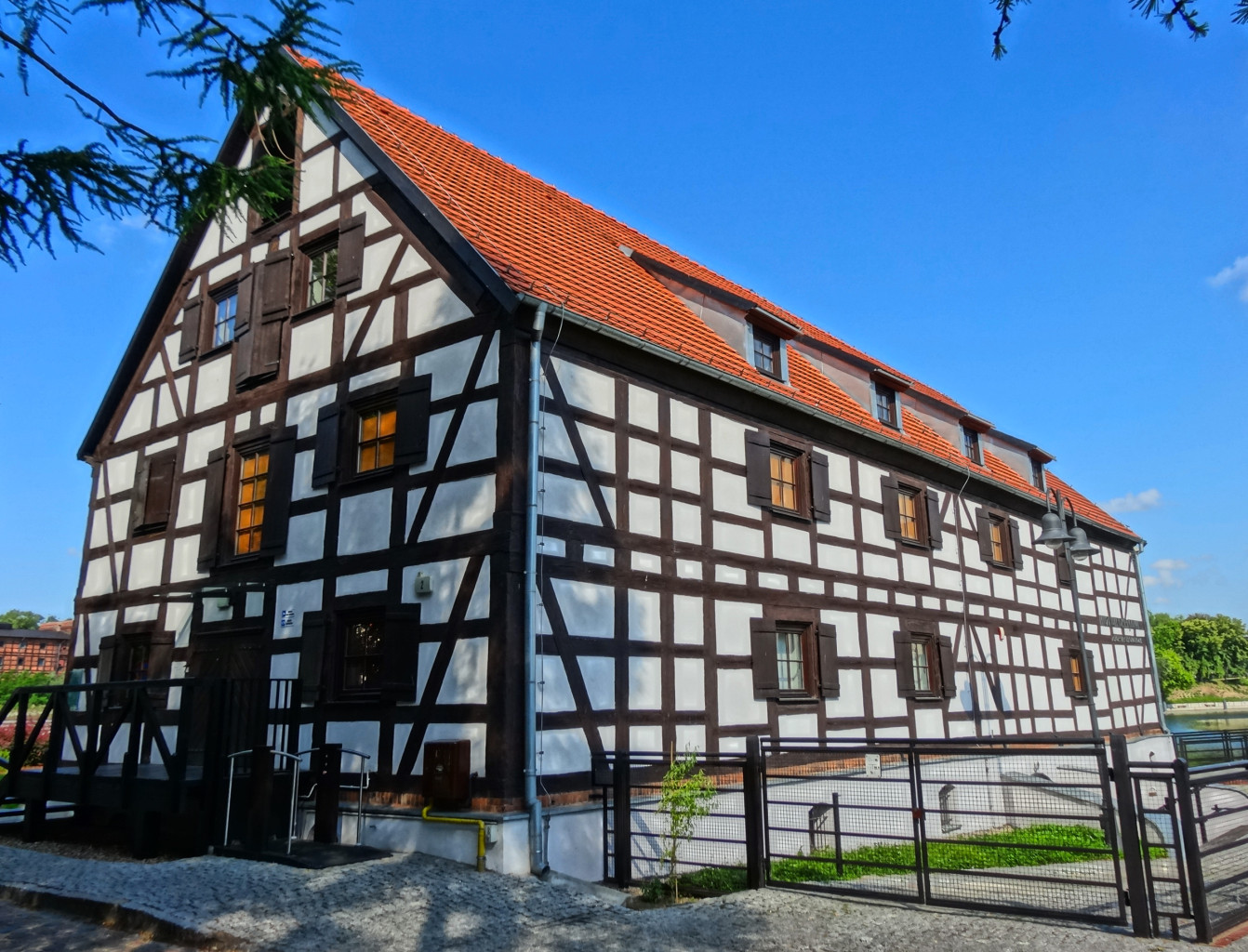
White Granary

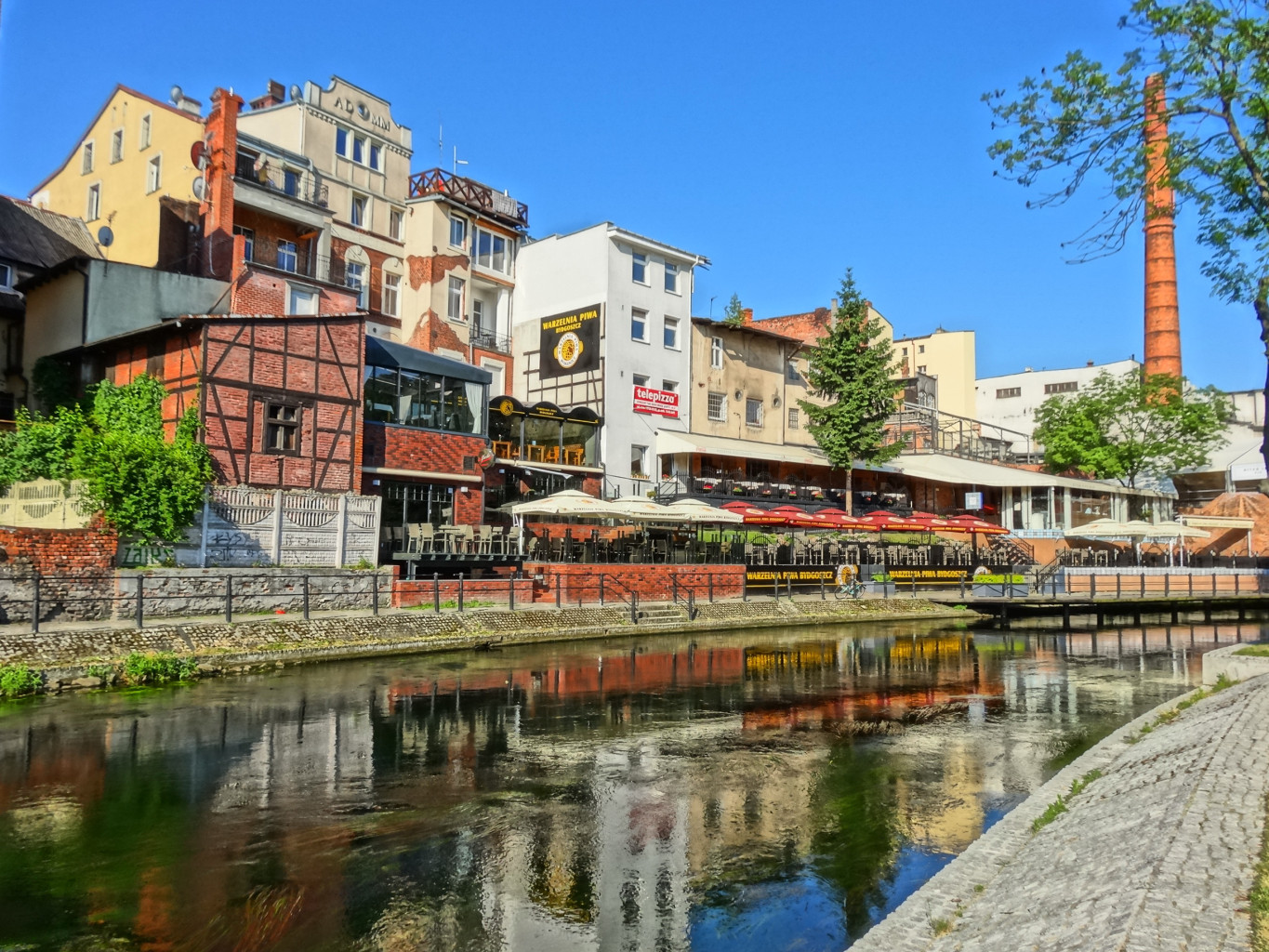
"Bydgoszcz Venice"

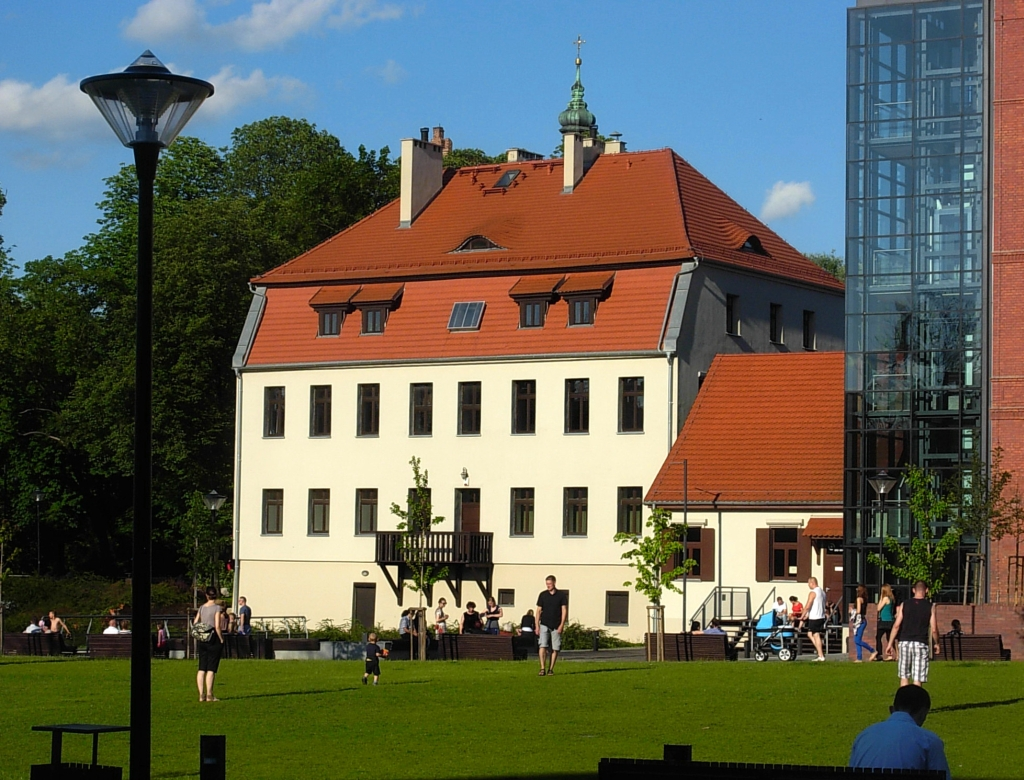
The administrative building of the mills

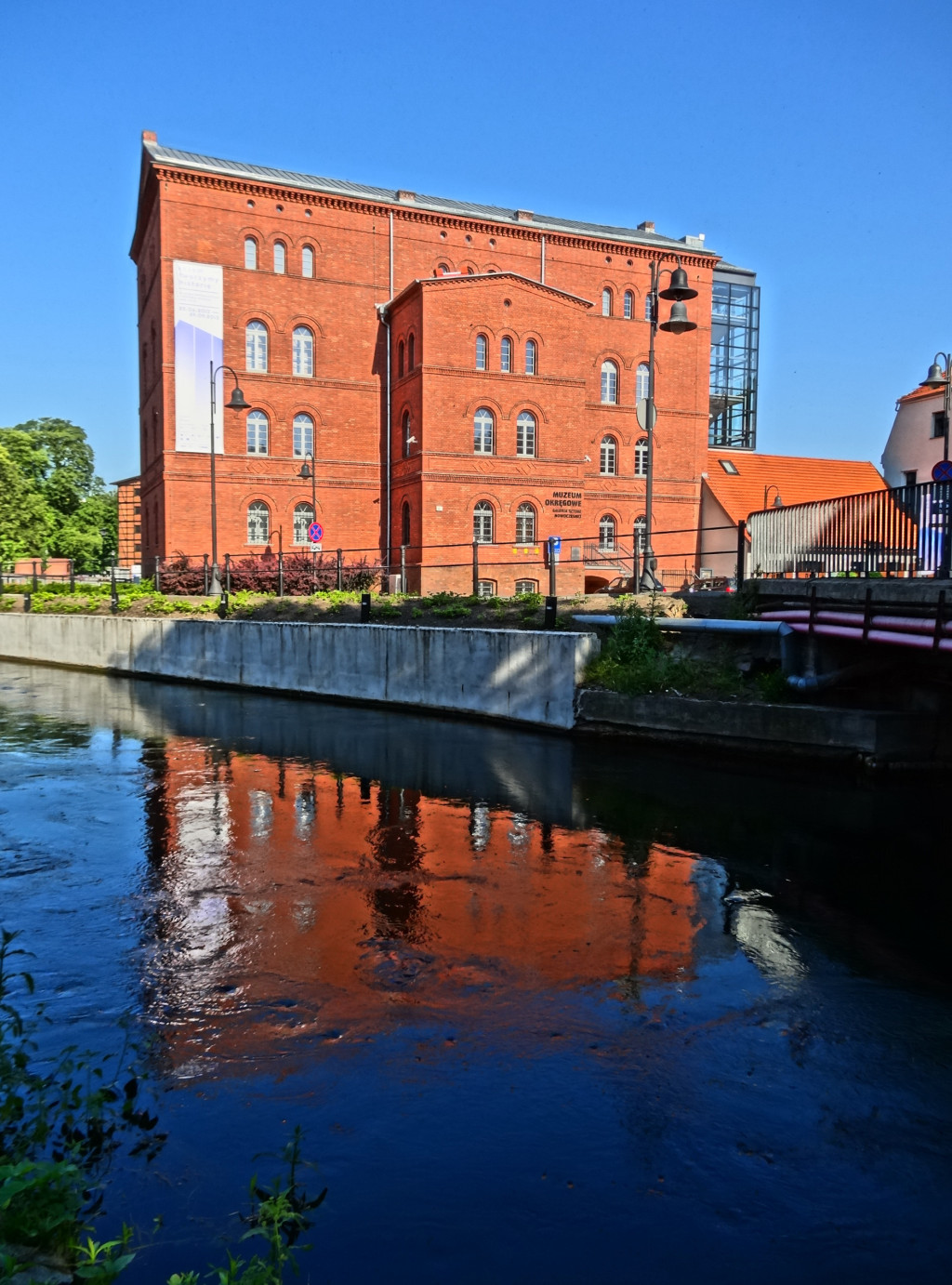
Red granary

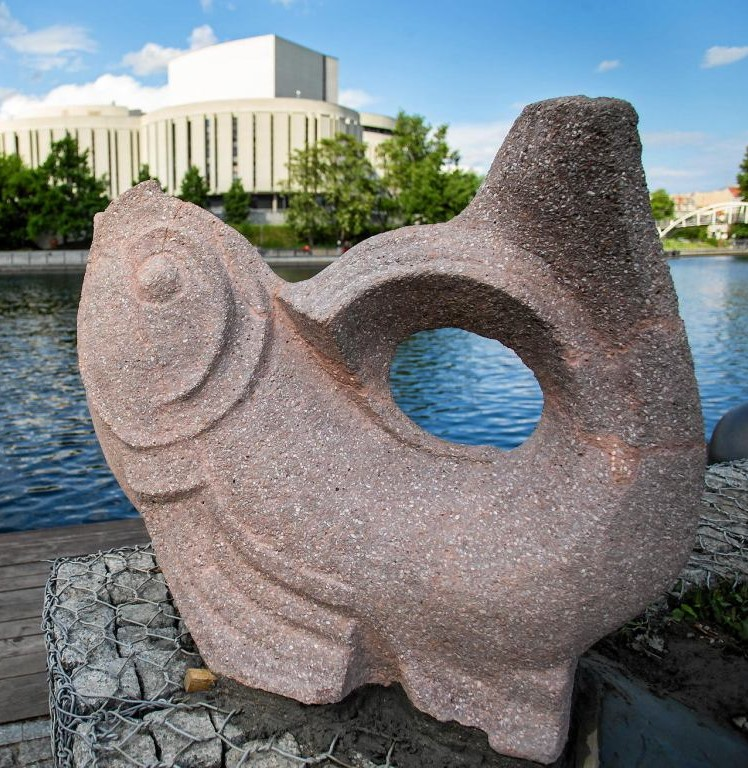
Józef Makowski's fish statue

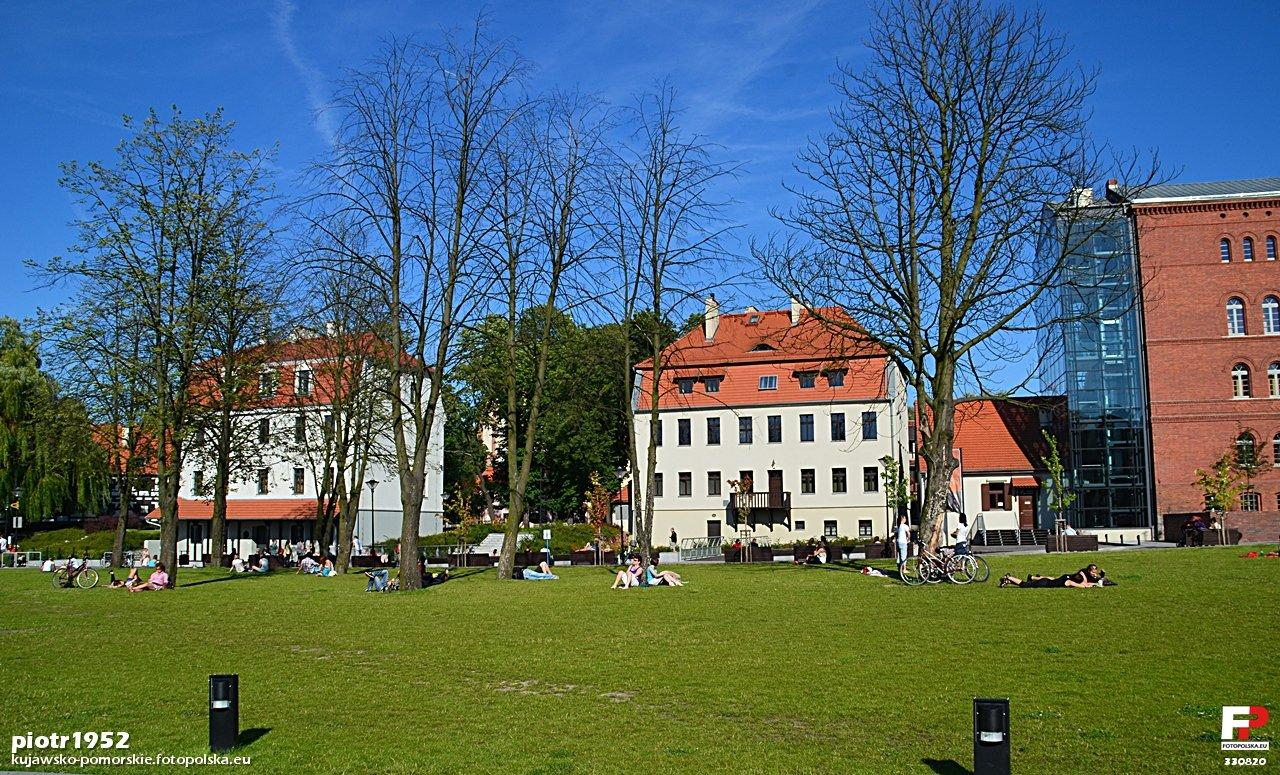
Grass esplanade on the island

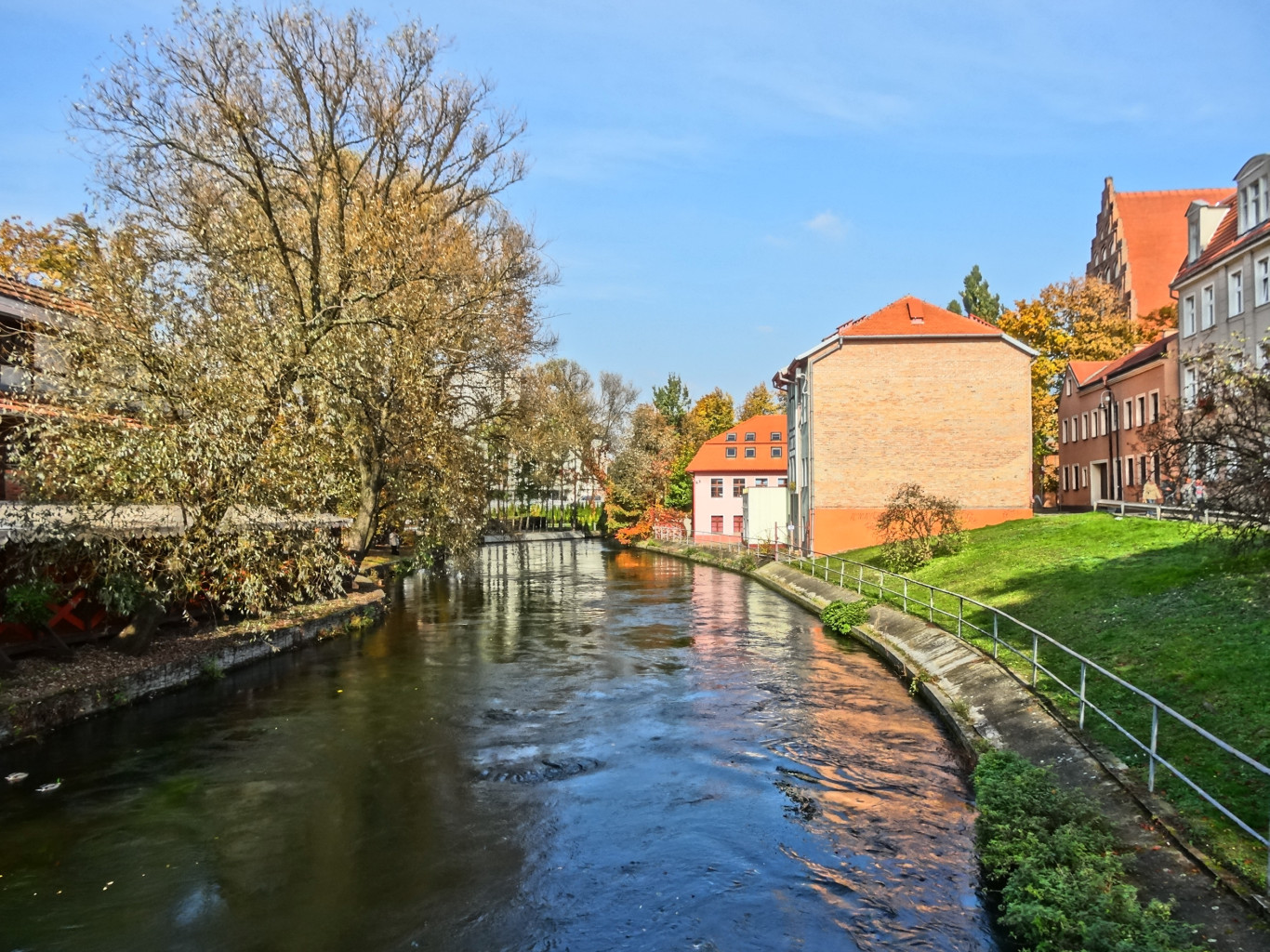
Leat river branch

== Buildings ==
Mill Island has been listed between 1985 and 1995 on the Polish Register of Historical Monuments under no. A/878, June 15, 1985 (mill buildings) and no. A/773/1-9, June 6, 1992. Elements noticed in the heritage article:

- historical character of the spatial arrangement,
- old trees,
- a monumental complex of mills and grain storehouses along with free-standing buildings surrounded by greenery.

Most listed buildings are located on the former coinage island. From the original 17th-century mint building there still can be seen foundations and basement vaults.

=== Historical granaries ===
==== White Granary ====
Located in the eastern part of Mill Island, on the banks of the Brda river, in the vicinity of the parish weir, it is the oldest preserved building in the Island. It was built in the 1790s in connection with the emergence of new grain mills in the northern part of the Mill Island. Till 1827, it was owned by the Kingdom of Prussia, then bought by Padecker, a merchant. Since then, its successors are companies. It was not until 1919 that it became the property of local governments, and then of the Polish state treasury. The facility was used till 1974 as a grain warehouse. Since the 1980s, the building houses the history department of "Leon Wyczółkowski" District Museum: here is mainly exhibited Bydgoszcz's history and craft traditions in Kujawy. From 2006 to 2008, the building was extensively renovated under the program "Restoration of cultural heritage on Mill Island" and fitted for exhibiting archaeological collections.

It has one storey with an attic, an elongated rectangle footprint and covered with a gable roof. It is a half-timbered construction. Worth noticing are:

- a Gothic cellar from the 15th century with cross vaults supported by massive brick pillars;
- a preserved original single-space interior layout, with wooden poles (now integrated in the ground floor).

The White Granary has been listed on Kuyavian-Pomeranian Voivodeship Monuments Heritage List (no. 601216, reg. A/878, June 15, 1985).

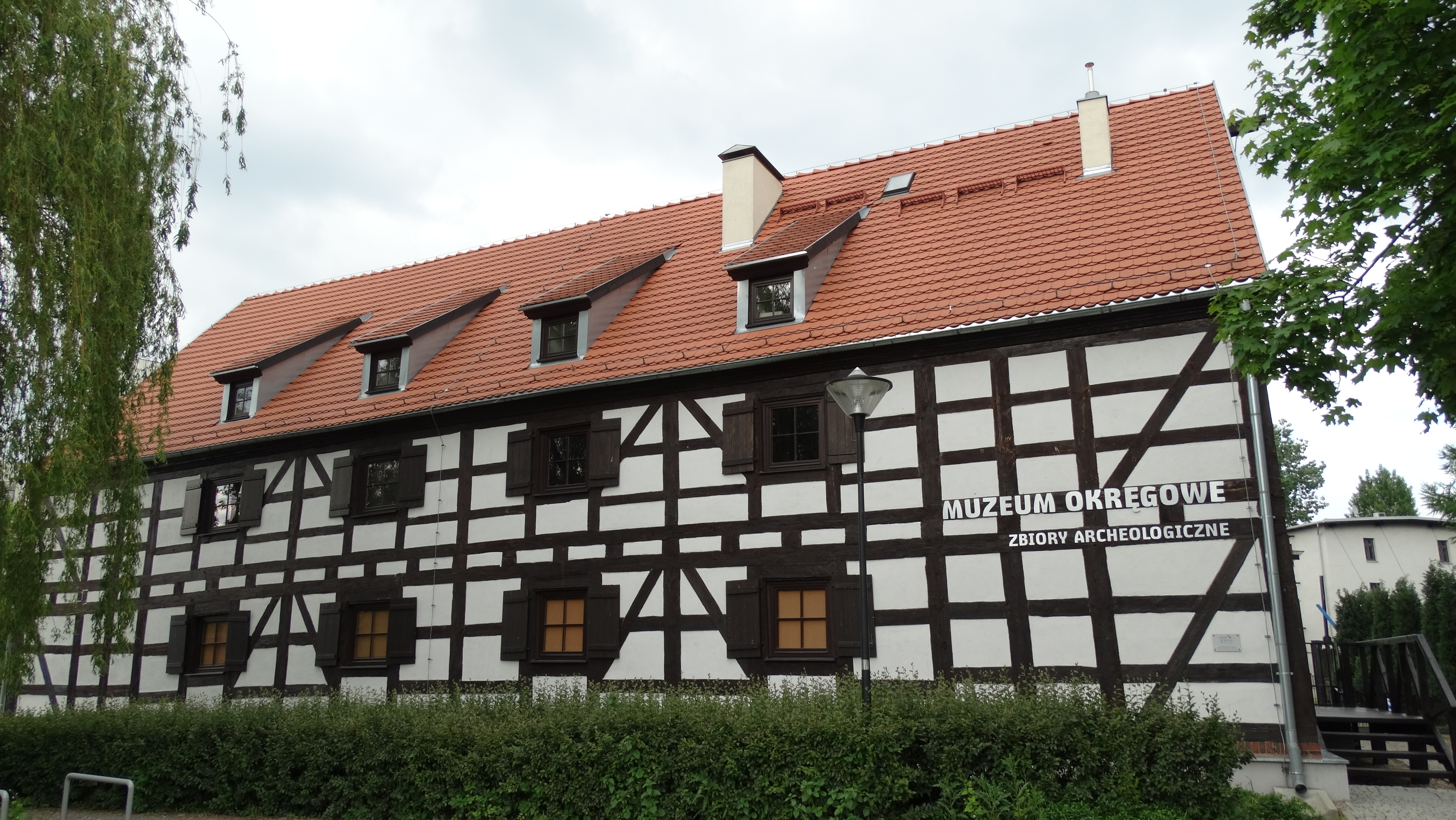
Facade of the museum

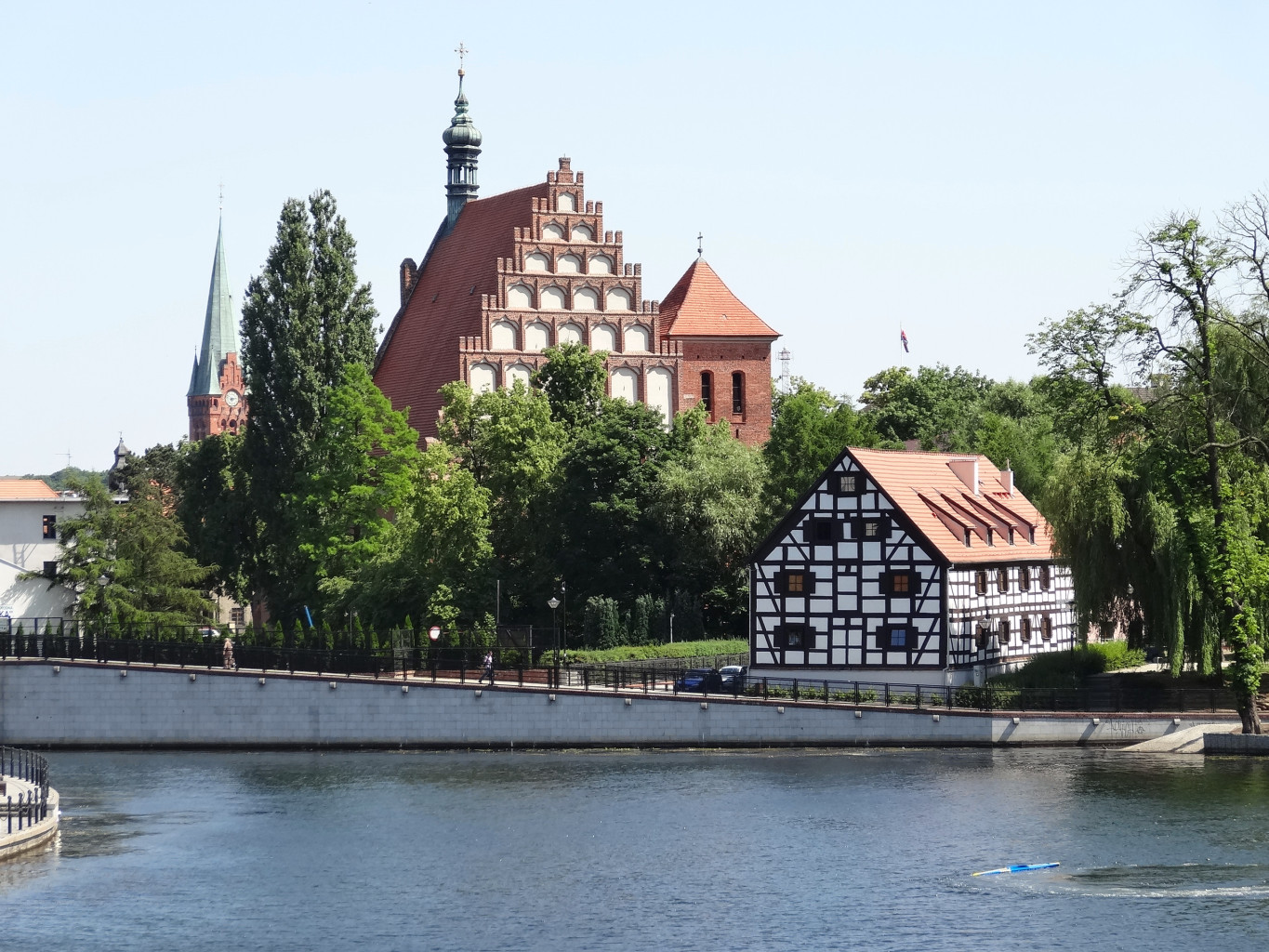
The White Granary with the cathedral in the background

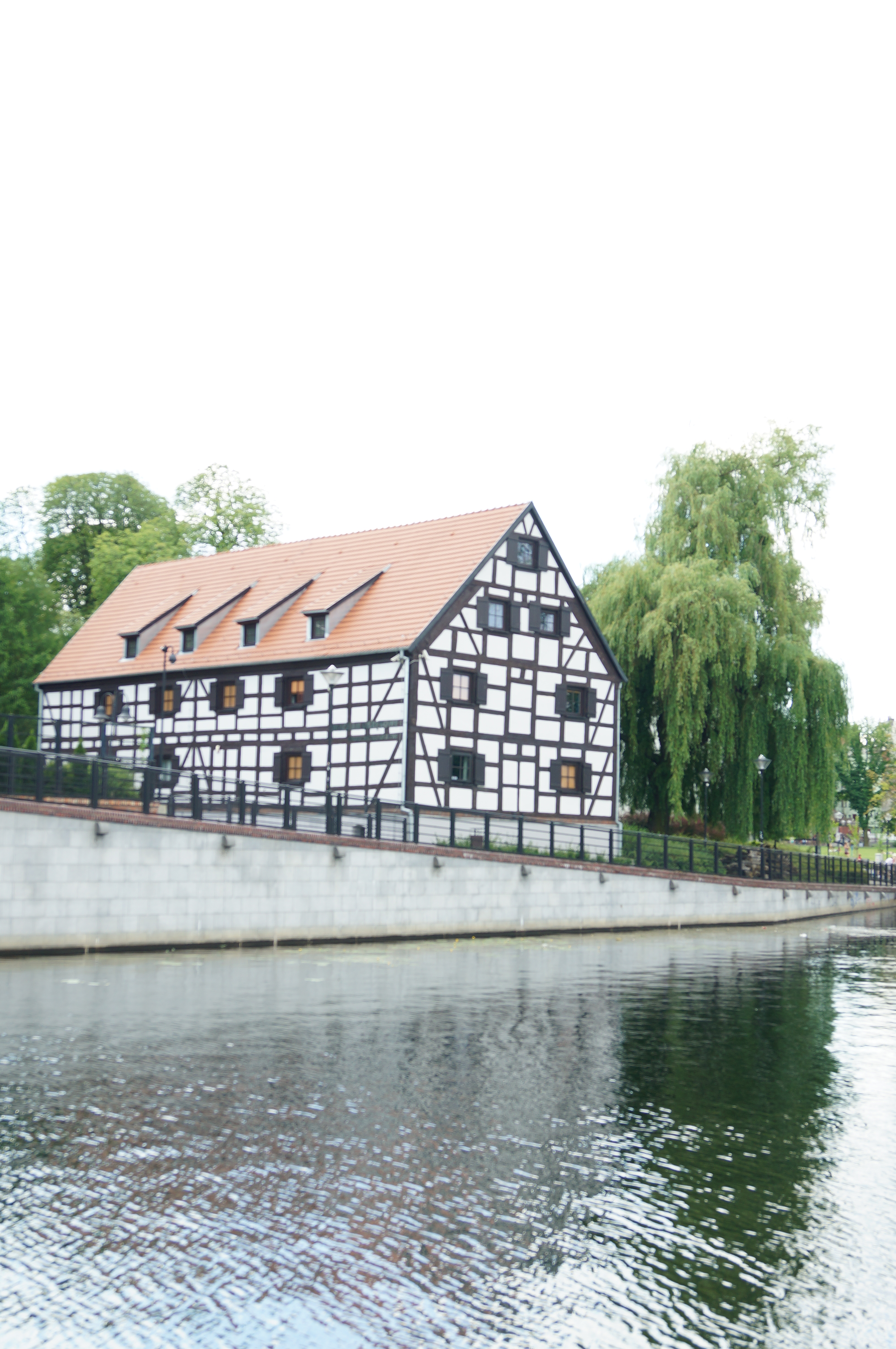
View from the opposite river bank

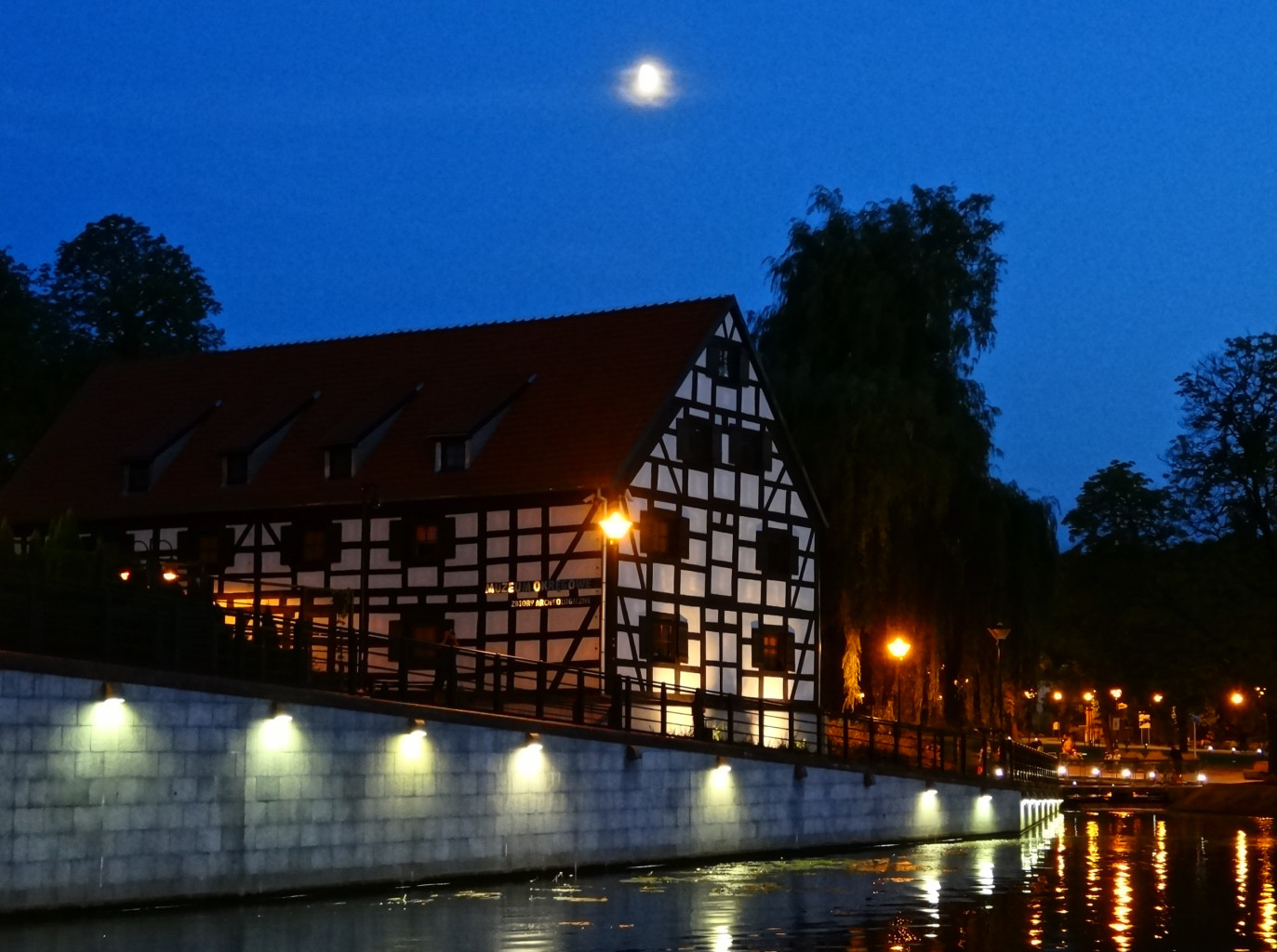
By night

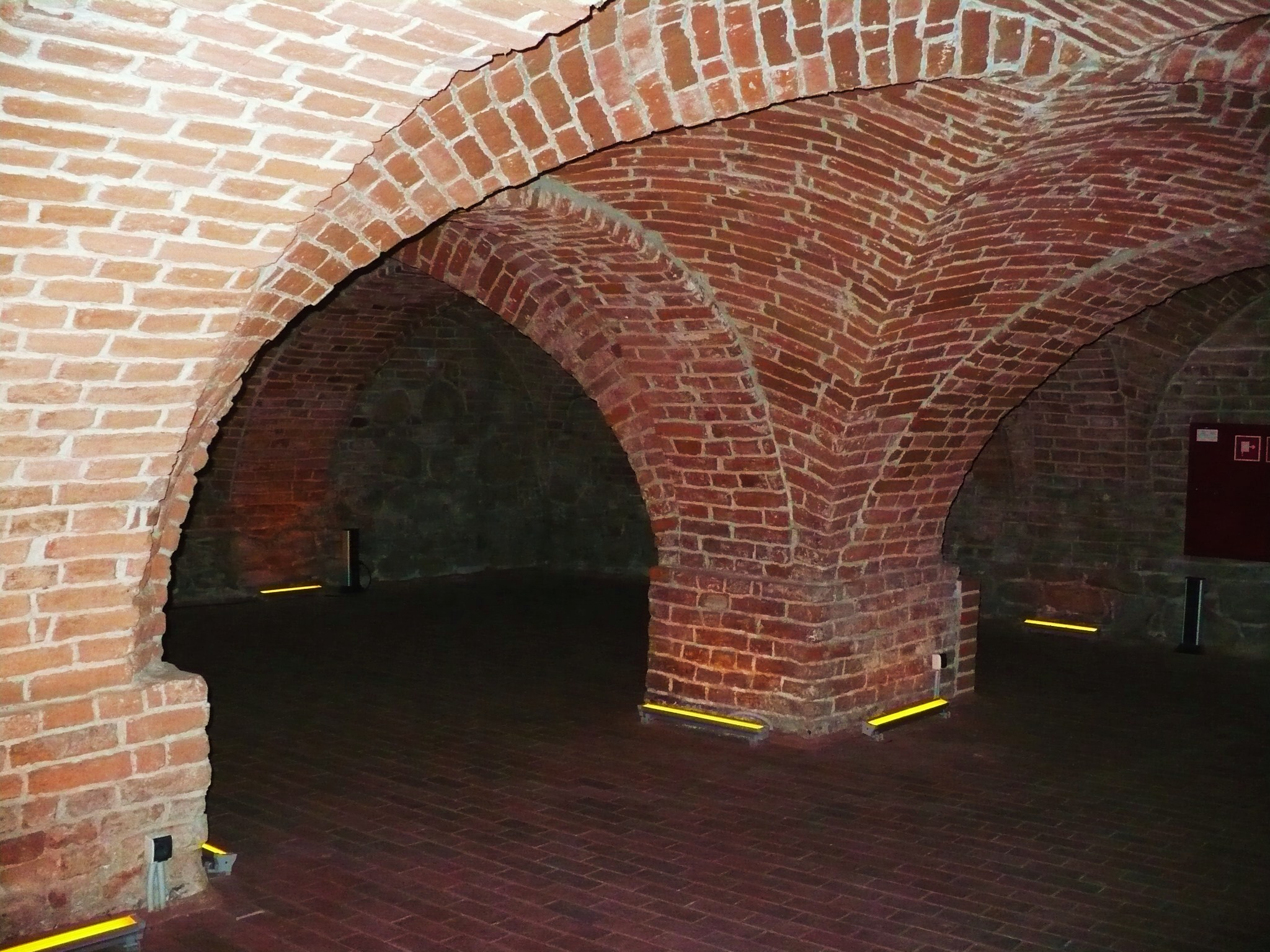
The vaulted cellar

==== The Mill Tavern (Karczma Młyńska) ====
Located on the waterfront of the leat branch, it was built around 1835 following timber framing method, with brick fillings. It was initially used to store bagged grains. The building has an elongated rectangle footprint, with a storey and windows on the roof wystawki. In the 1990s, the granary has undergone thorough renovations. Today it houses the restaurant The Mill Tavern, Polish: Karczma Młyńska. The building has been listed on Kuyavian-Pomeranian Voivodeship Monuments Heritage List (no. 601214, reg. A/773/1-9, June 9, 1992).

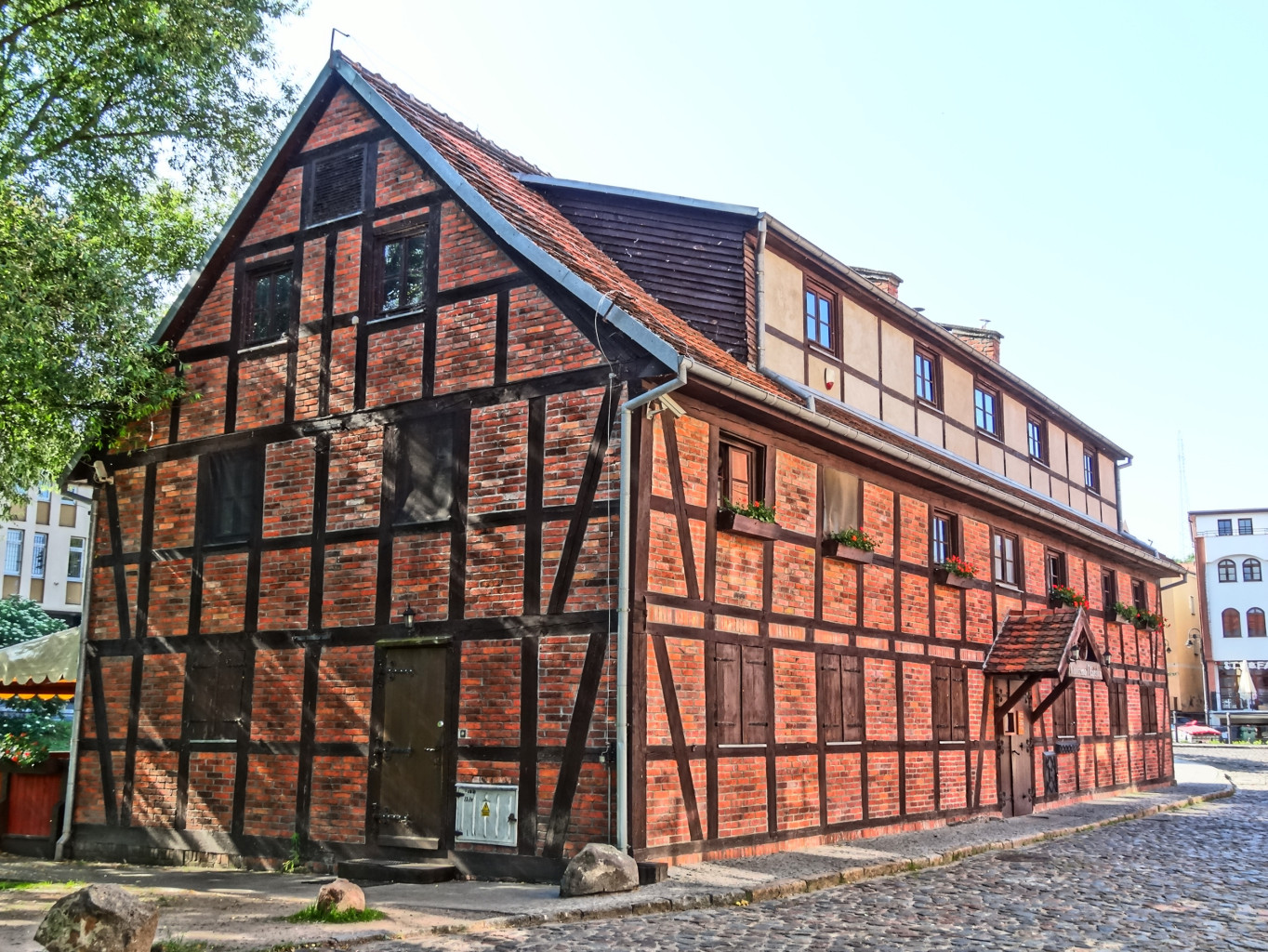
The house

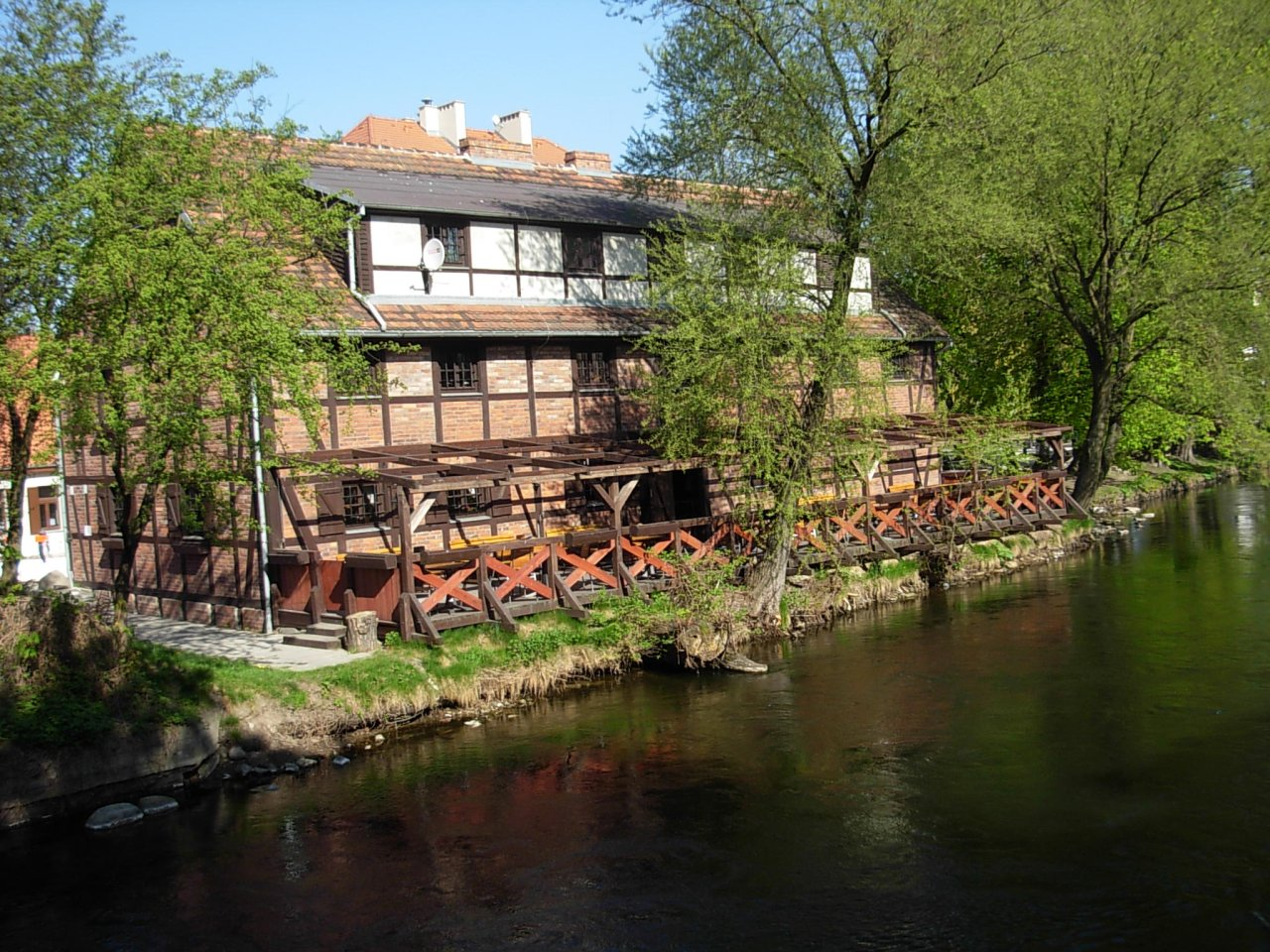
View from the bridge over the leat

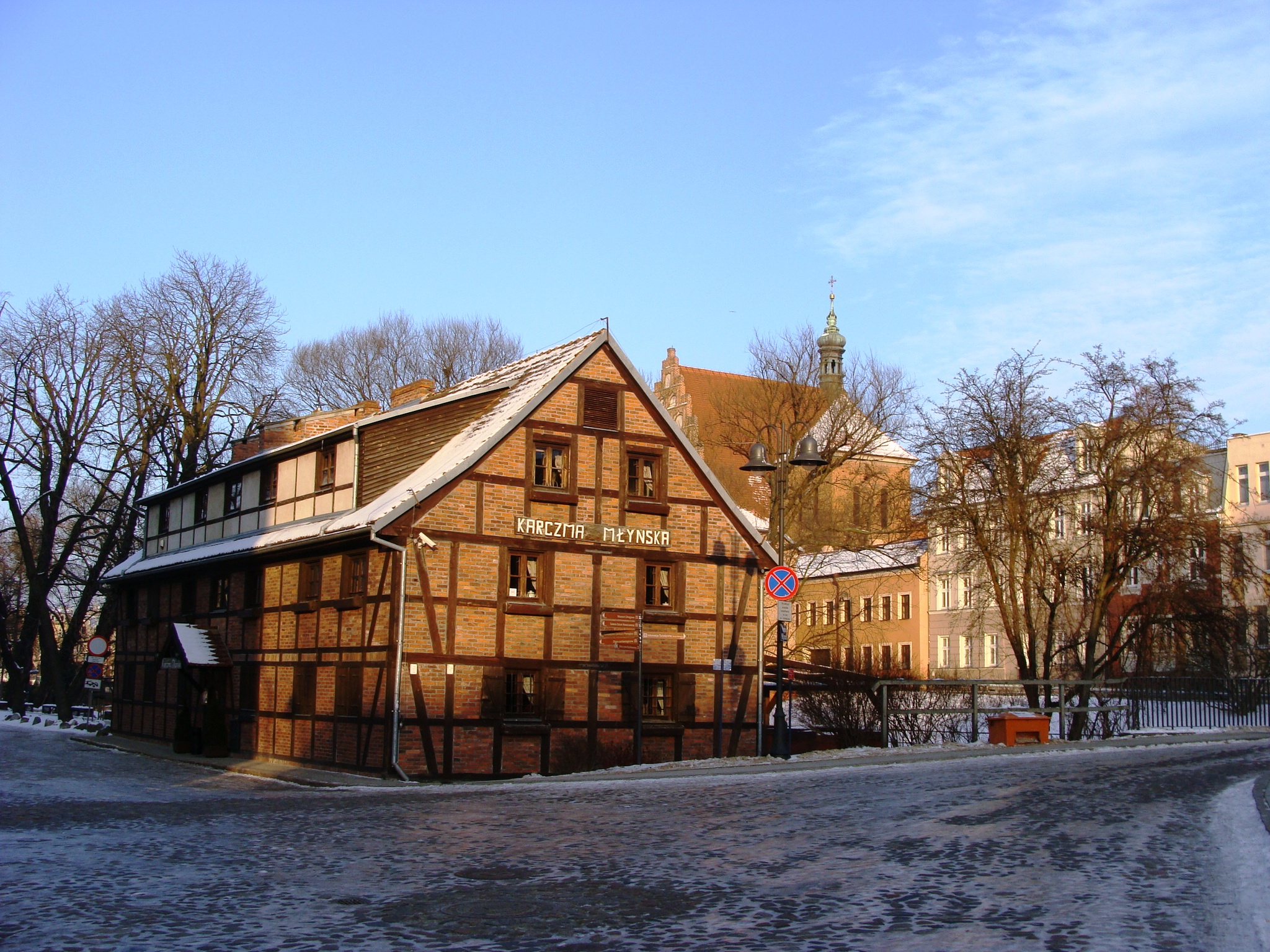
View from Mennica street

==== The Red Granary ====
Standing opposite the Mill Bridge, it is the largest preserved granary in Bydgoszcz. Formerly so-called "Mill Camphausen", it has been built by the architect Wolff in 1861. "Mill Camphausen" complex had eight grinding lines, with an annex, a boiler room, a mill windmill, and a granary. The mill was gradually refurbished and expanded: in 1930, the building consisted of a mill, an outbuilding, a boiler house, a turbine, a lock and an airlock, a flour granary, a miller's house, an administration house with a porch and an outhouse and a shed. Behind the building is the beginning of the "Międzywodzie kanal" which parts Mill Island. Originally, adjoined to the Red Granary was set water wheels driving the mill, it was disbanded in 1917 when transitioning to hydroelectric power station. Today the adjacent building, the Miller's House, is fully rehabilitated. In 1975, the Red Granary has been attached to the Regional Museum and accommodated sporadically several art shows between 1998 and 2006. In 2006-2008, it was extensively renovated under the program Restoration of cultural heritage on Mill Island. Since 2009, the Red Granary houses Bydgoszcz Modern Art Gallery.

The Red Granary is a massive, four-storey, brick building with a basement. The interior layout of each floor is designated. The basement is brick vaulted. Since 2008 renovation and reconstruction, the facility now includes a glass staircase adjacent to the building from the north. The Red Granary has been listed on Kuyavian-Pomeranian Voivodeship Monuments Heritage List (no. 601215, reg. A/773/1-9, June 9, 1992).

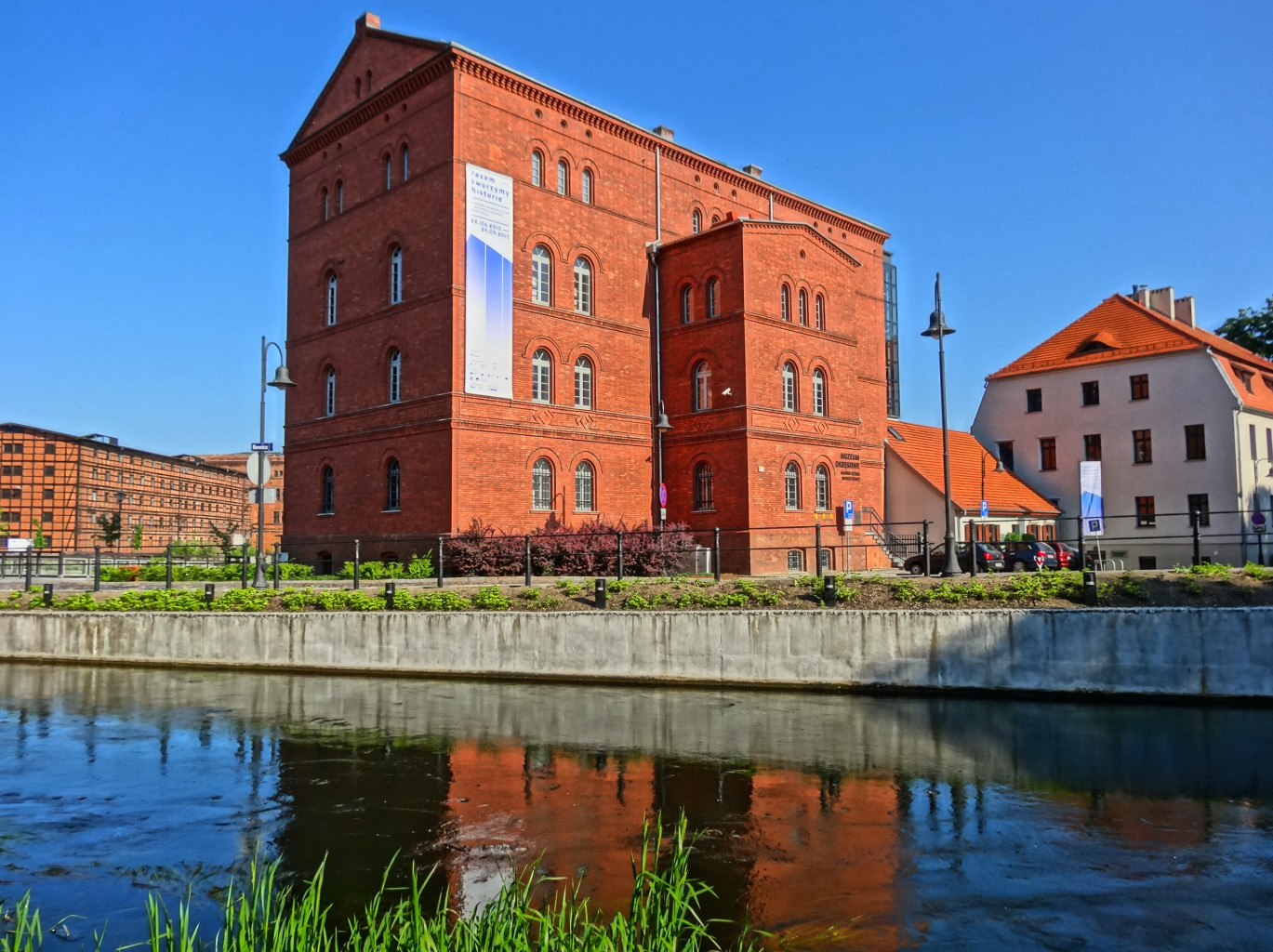
View from the leat

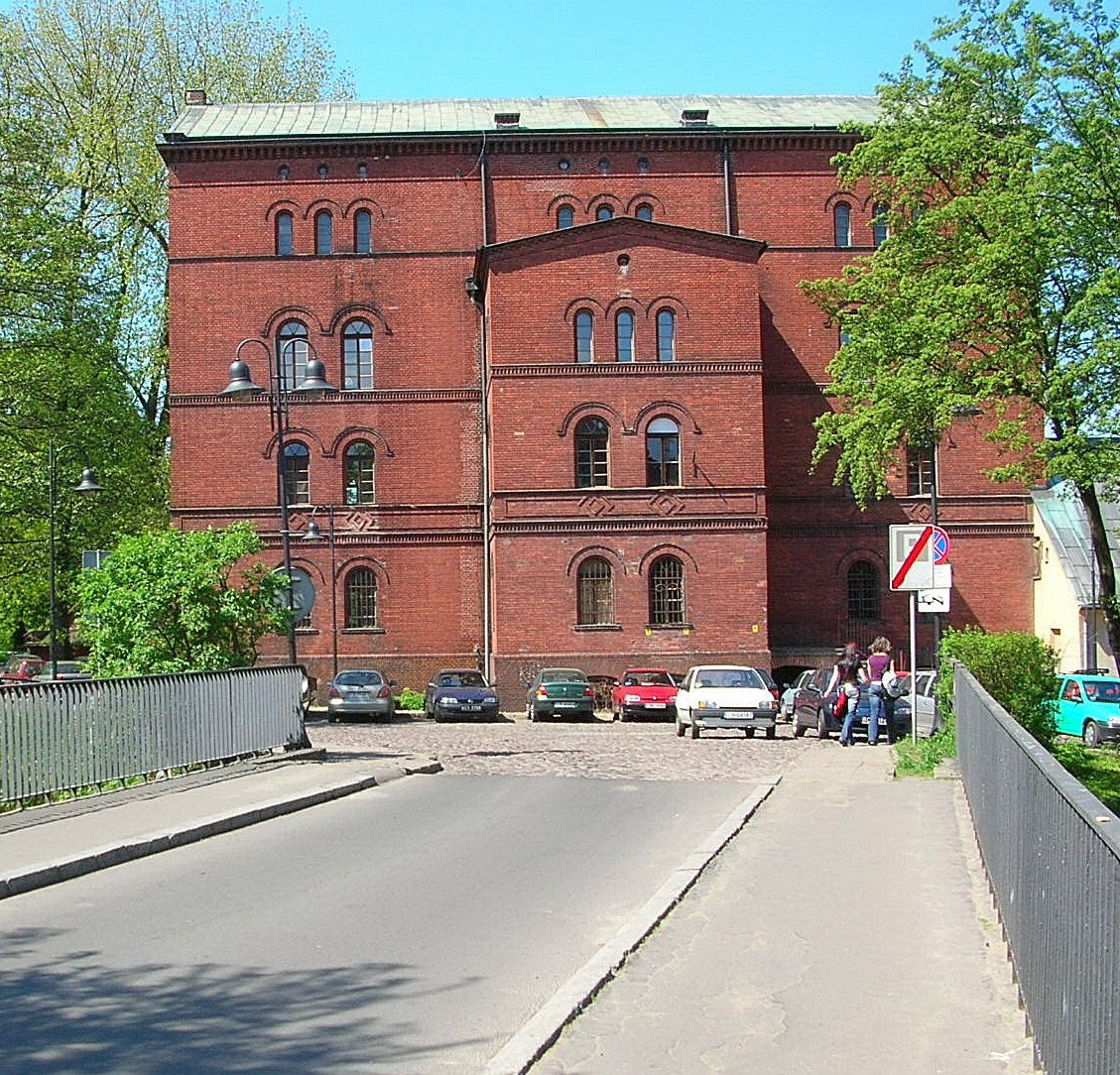
Eastern facade

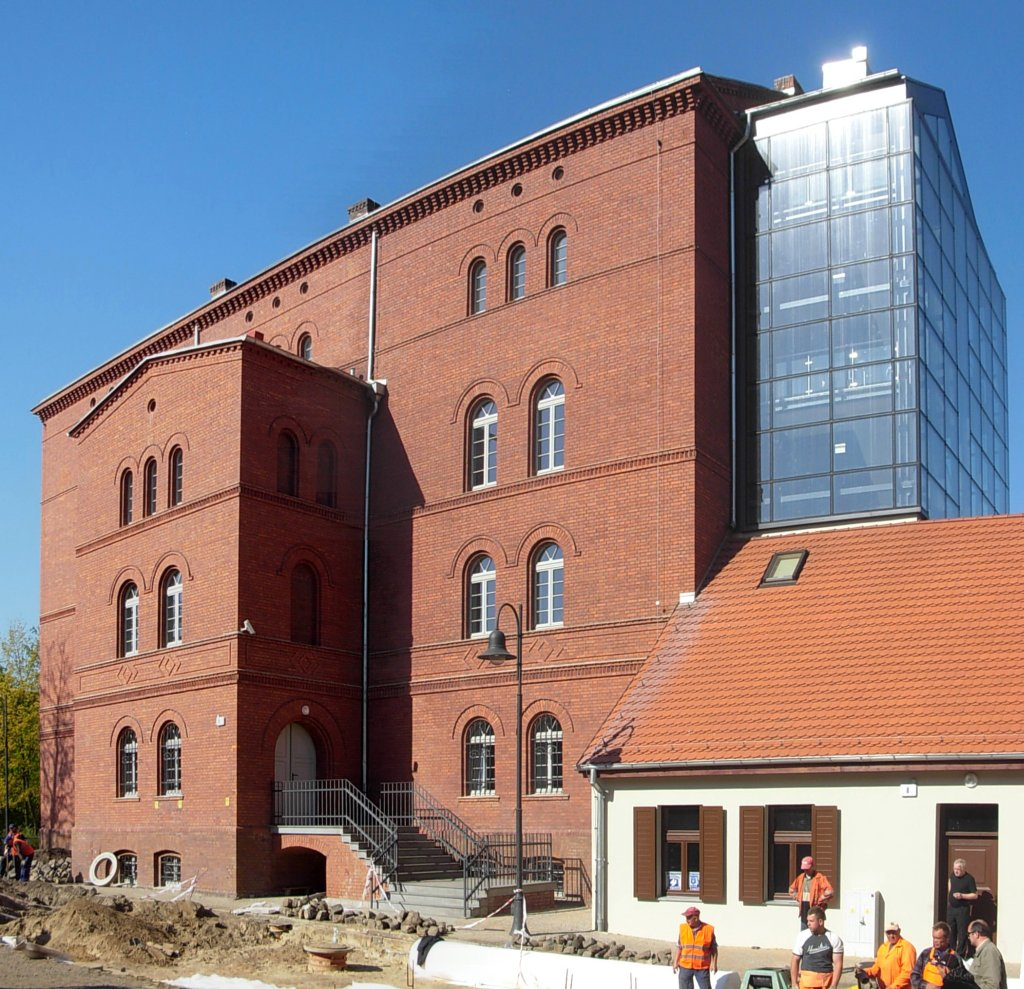
View on the modern addition

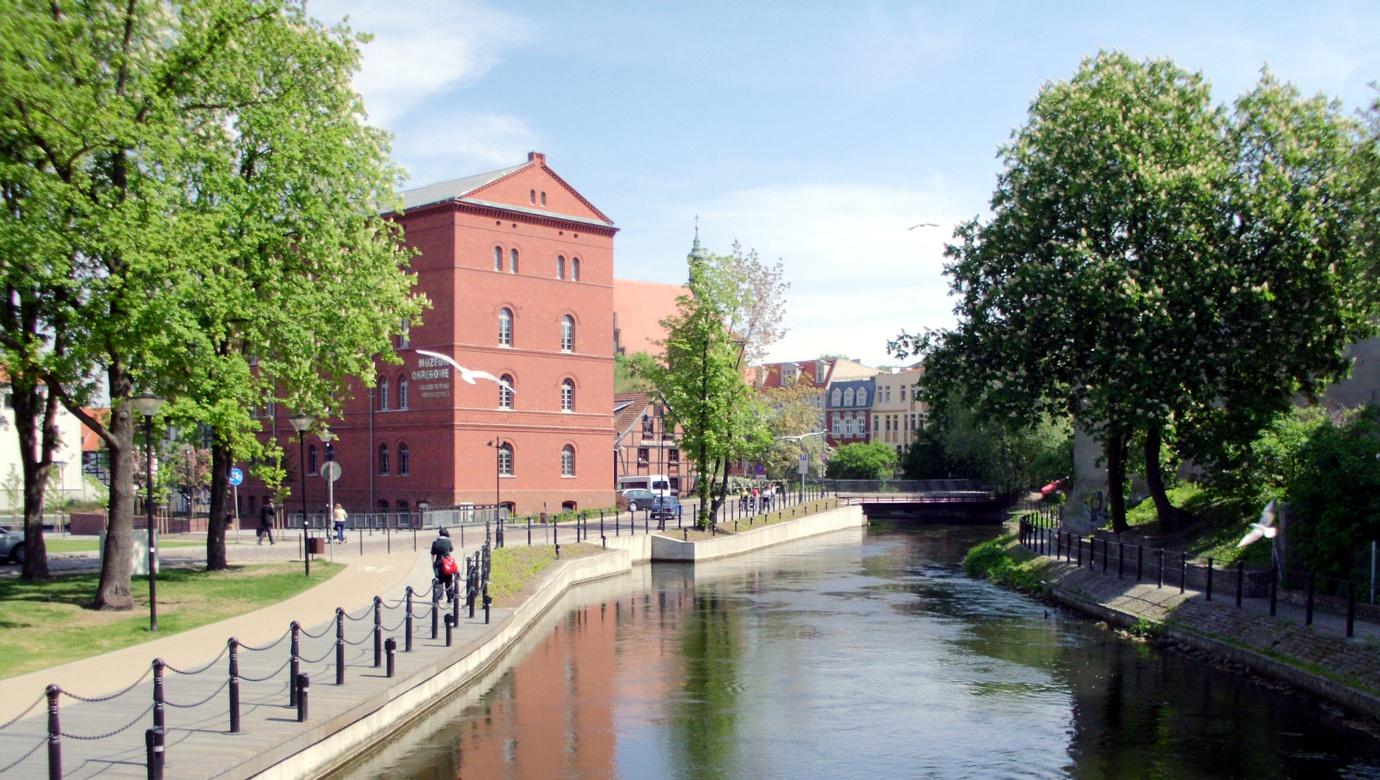
View from the leat

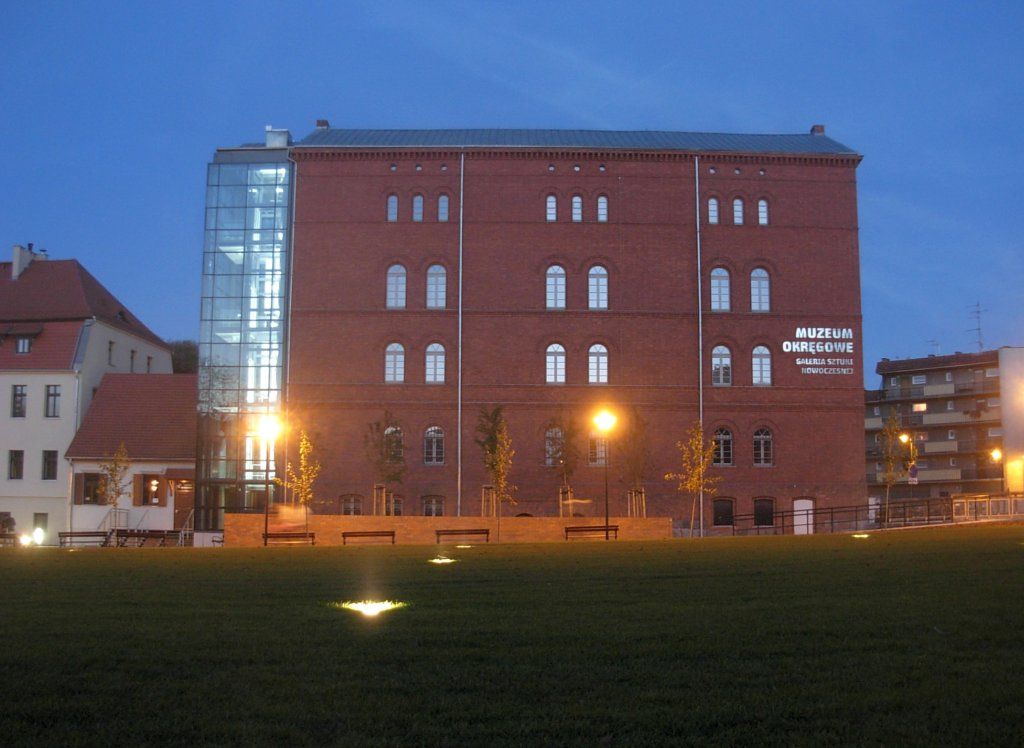
By night

=== Old mills and industrial facilities ===
==== Rother's Mills ====
Rother's Mills are located in the central part of the Mill Island in Bydgoszcz, directly adjacent to the flow of the river. From the north it is bordered by the Brda, and on the west by the "Grain Channel".

The mills ensemble is composed of three blocks: a main building and western and eastern wings. The main building is brick built, and has four levels covered with a gable roof. The main building still preserves its interior layout of galleries on each floor. Western and eastern wings are half-timbered constructed, both five-storey high.

Rother's Mills story goes back to the mid-19th century, when, thanks to the opening of Bydgoszcz Canal linking the Brda river and Vistula river, Bydgoszcz became a center of trade in grain and timber towards Western Europe (before the canal, grain was floated down rivers to Gdańsk).

Grain turnover gave rise to new industries, creating needs for new mills and bakeries. In 1825 a consortium took control of mills on Mill Island, trading within local market but also abroad, Germany, Great Britain, and even Brazil. In 1842, Rother's Mills were integrated in a complex of several facilities, renamed Royal Mills, pioneering the first steam engine in Bydgoszcz in 1846. This year was the start of erection of Rother's Mills, on the area belonging to merchant Rauber where previously stood gardens. The entire Rother facility has been complete in 1849-1850. The project comprised not only a massive production building, but also:

- a boiler room and engine room with a chimney,
- a flour granary,
- a pumping station (and turbine house),
- a fish ladder.

All buildings were set on corrosion-resistant stilts. At the junction of "Grain Channel" and the leat was also created a wooden bridge with brick pillars, incorporating waterwheels.

In 1861, a new company took over the mill: state-owned Die Königliche Seehandlung Societäts zu Berlin and in 1886, mill was electricity powered.

In 1919, Bydgoszcz municipality took possession of the facility, then in 1921 the Ministry of budget of Second Polish Republic. In 1928, some buildings Mill Island were managed directly by the National Cereal Plant Industry.

After World War II, Rother's Mills were taken over by the State Enterprises Grain and Mills ("Zbożowo-Młynarskiego"). Until the 1980s, the transportation of grain to the mills was executed by water: grain barges were plying into the canal, where a suction tube contraption transported the grain into barns. The end of economic activity for Rother's Mills happened in the 1990s.

At this time, premises were purchased by the company "Hotel", which planned to renovate it into a luxury property, following a project by Warsaw architects Bulanda & Fly: in addition to the hotel, a convention center, a restaurant, a recreation center, an underground garage, as well as rental office space were forecast. The project collapsed after a few months due to financial problems. The following owner, company "Nordic Development", had plans to revitalize the ensemble into an hotel and an entertainment center but the project was never finalized.

In December 2013, Bydgoszcz city acquired the property from "Nordic Development" for 25 million PLN. After a long and thorough refurbishment, in November 2022, city authorities renamed the ensemble "Centrum Nauki i Kultury Młyny Rothera " (English: Rother's Mills Science and Culture Centre); it hosts now permanent and occasional exhibitions. The renovation project received in 2021 the title of "Modernization of the Year" at the nationwide competition "Modernization of the Year and Construction of the 21st Century".

"Rother's Mills" is composed of three parts: the main building and western and eastern wings. The main building is brick made. It has a four-storey basement with a gable roof. Interior layouts of the galleries are still preserved on each floor. Eastern and western wings are half-timbered constructions with five-storey each. The west wing on the river side stands on high stone-pedestal foundations. Rother's Mills have been listed on Kuyavian-Pomeranian Voivodeship Monuments Heritage List (no. 601219, reg. A/773/1-9, June 9, 1992).

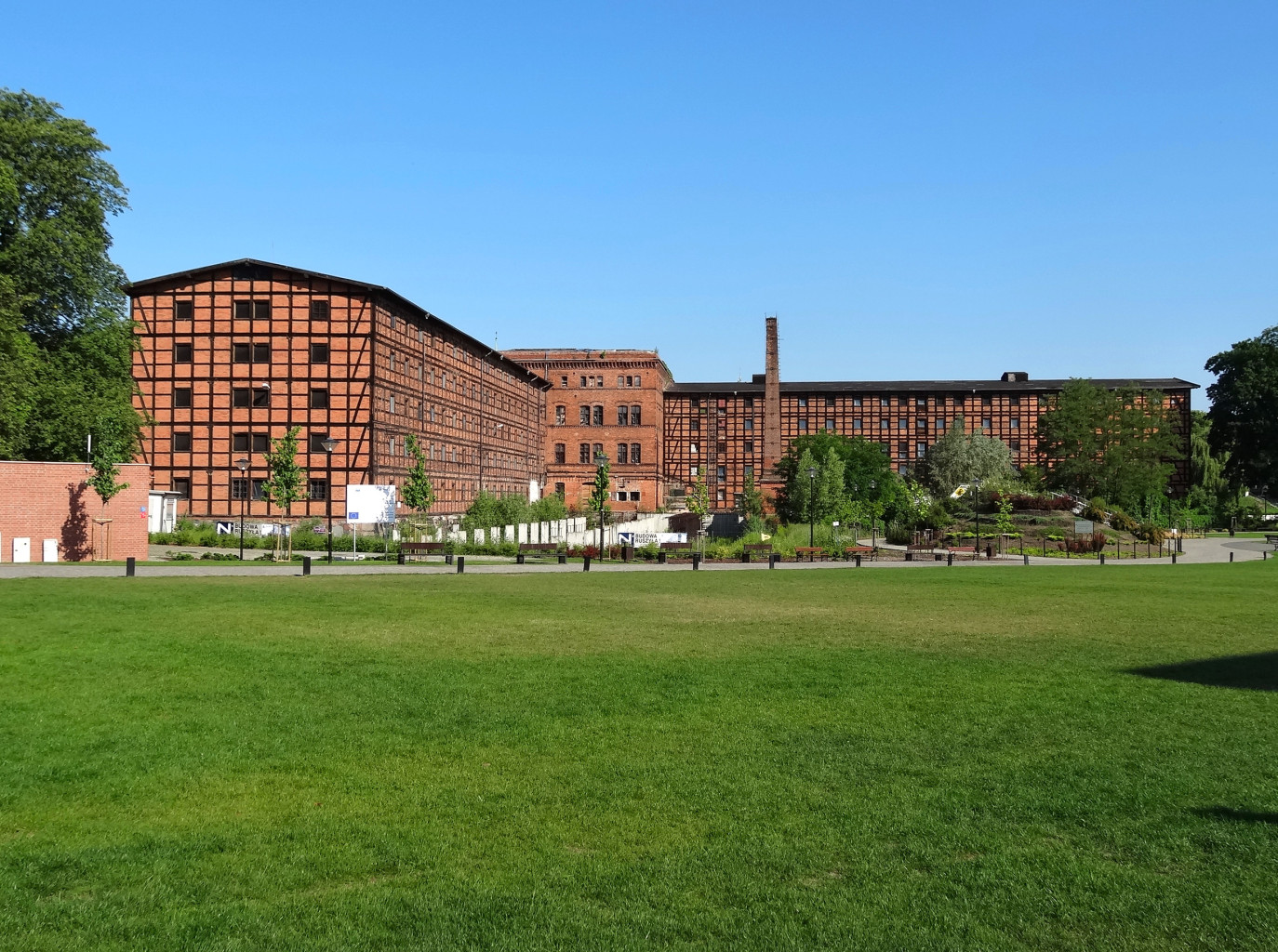
View from esplanade

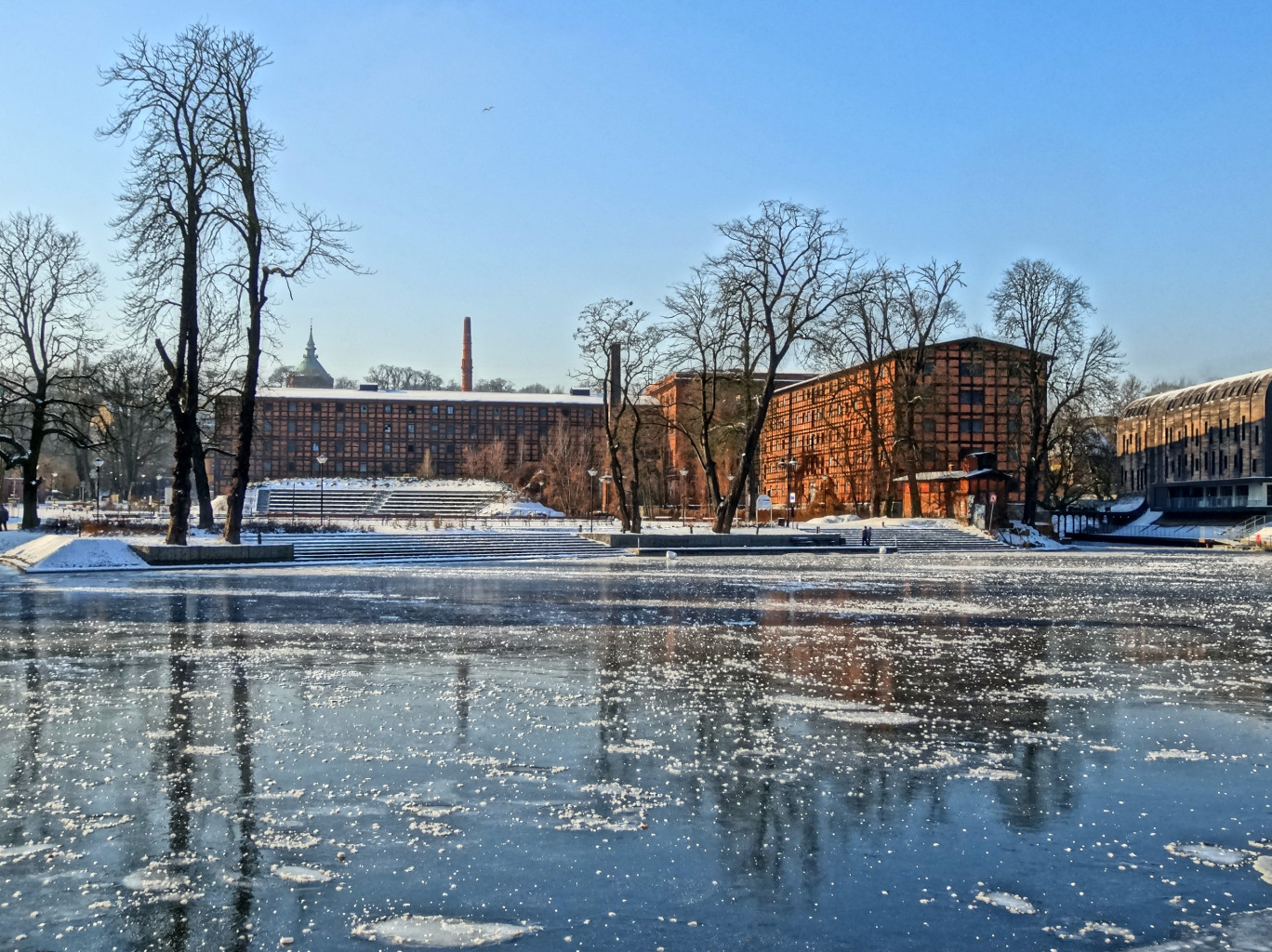
View from Brda river

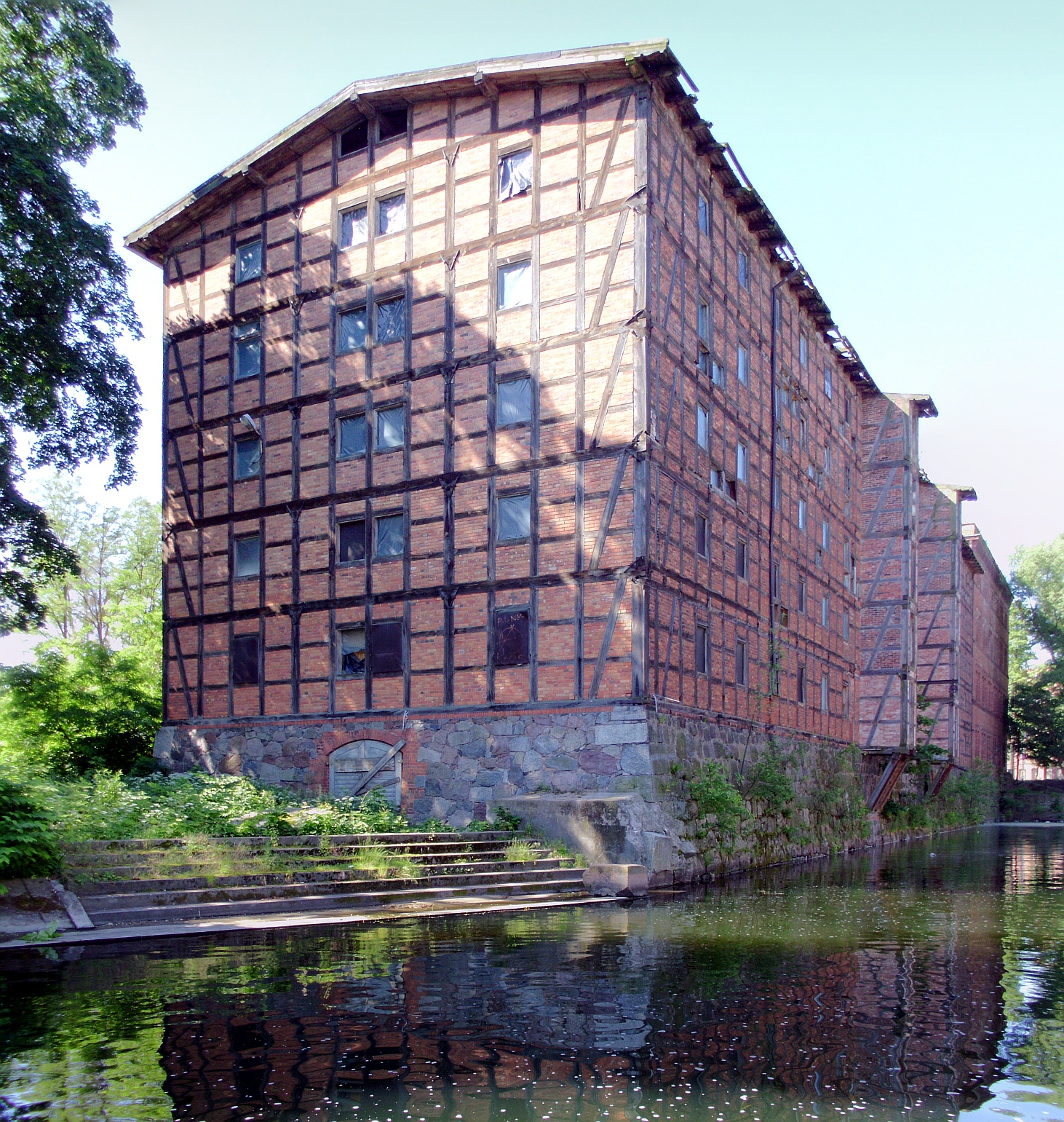
One of the wing

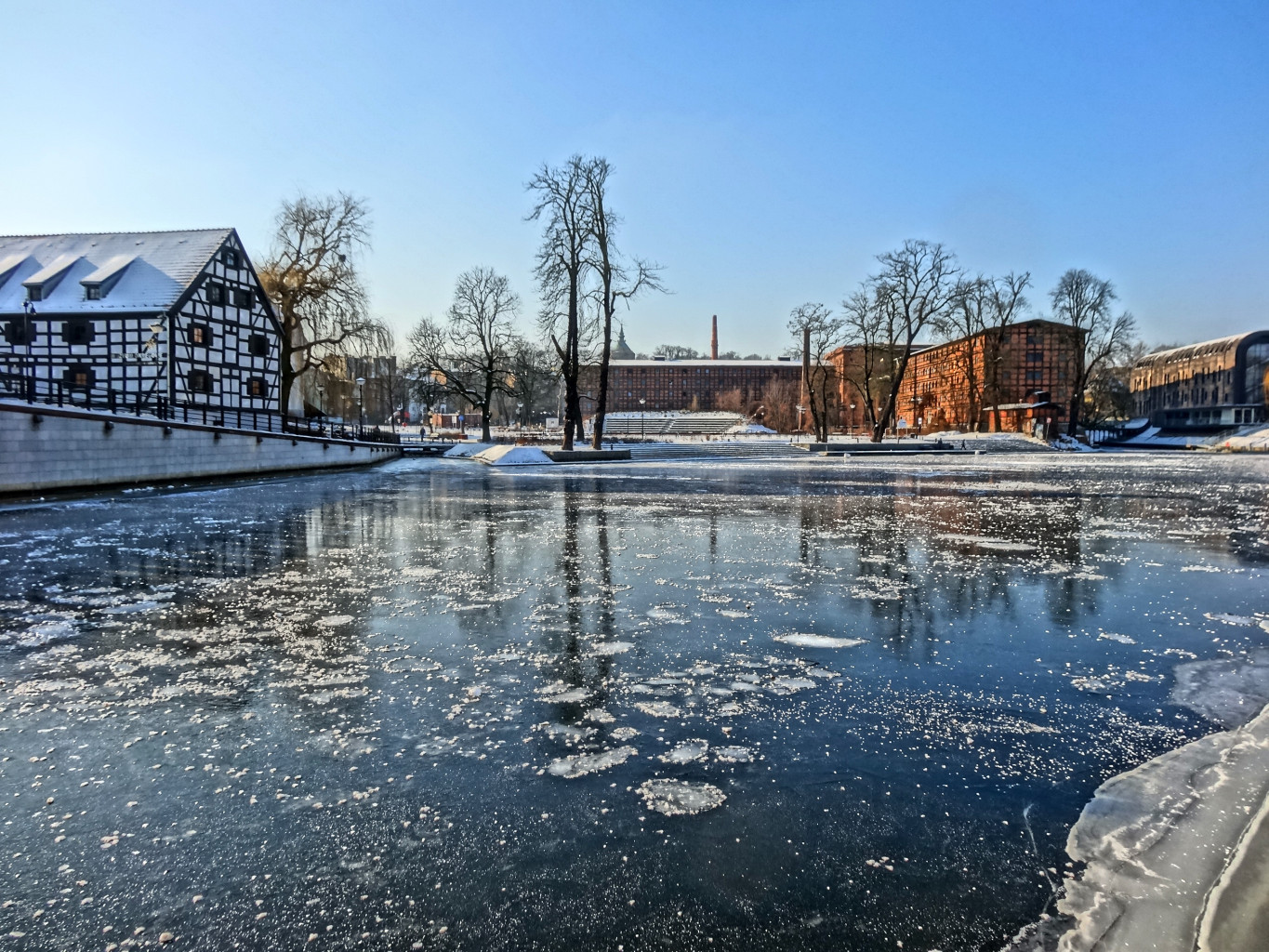
Rother's Mills and the White Granary

==== Kujawska Hydropower plant ====
Located at the junction of the leat branch and the Brda river, the place has been built and re-built successively since 1786, when a flour mill was constructed there. The power plant has been built in 1920, mainly to supply power to the numerous mills of the island, but the complex kept its granary building. The turbine had a capacity of 110 kW and it provided power to houses in the vicinity of the Old Market, but it was not linked to the city network. Two water turbines were laid out in the building, upright with wooden teeth gear.

In 1975, a technical expertise declared the turbine chamber unfitted for current standards. As a consequence, the National Cereal Plant announced in the 1990s a tender for the sale of the ruined building. In July 1998, an entrepreneur, "Jerzy Kujawski", builder of a hydropower in Kashubia has become the new owner. He made a thorough repair to the facility and installed a new turbine: the new power plant was launched on December 1, 1998. Between 2000 and 2005, building facades have been renovated, a general overhaul of three turbines has been done and two new ones have been delivered. "Kujawska" power plant had a capacity of 600 kW in 2009, 600 kW of which were transferred to Bydgoszcz Energy department network.

In 2009 a Museum of energy has opened in the facility: its aim is to recall the history of Bydgoszcz energy, hydropower plants operating in the city area and present people who played an active role in this story. The first exhibition featured a history of power plants and technical equipment. Some rooms also houses exhibitions of power equipment and a large collection of radios from the 20th century (250 pieces). The hydropower plant "Kujawska" has been listed on Kuyavian-Pomeranian Voivodeship Monuments Heritage List (no. 601217 & 601218, reg. A/773/1-9, June 9, 1992).

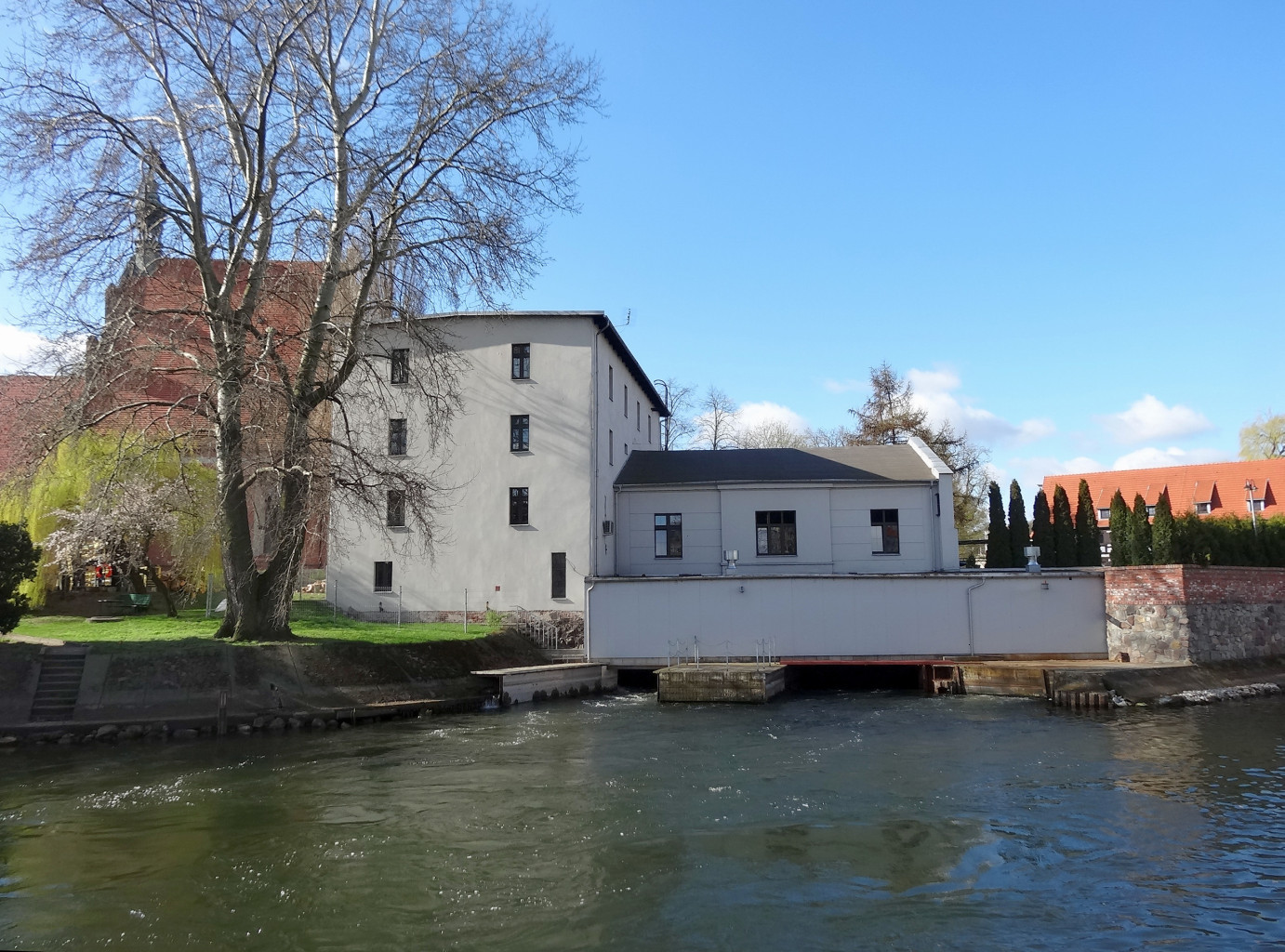
Main Facade onto the Brda river

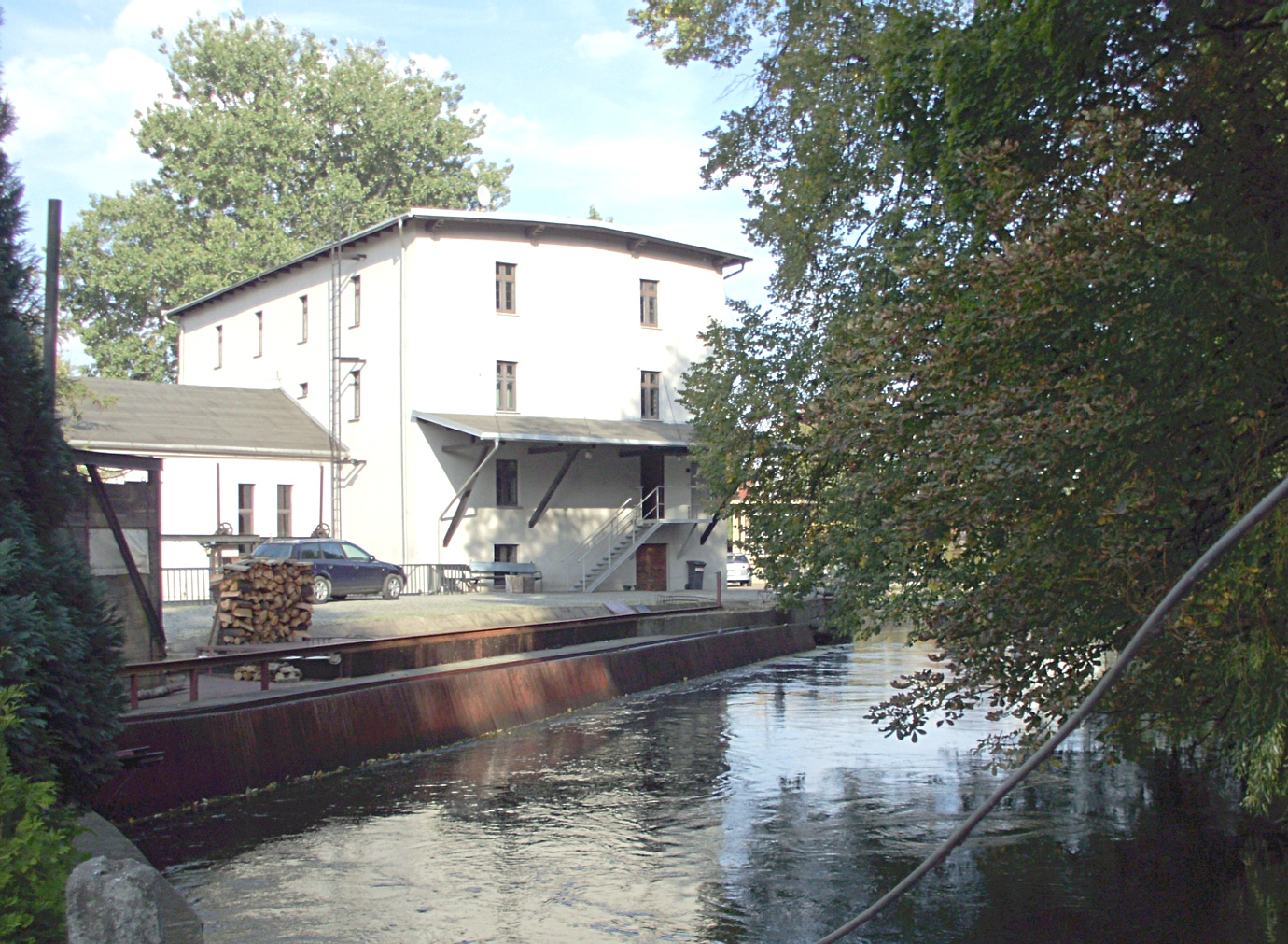
Side view of the original granary

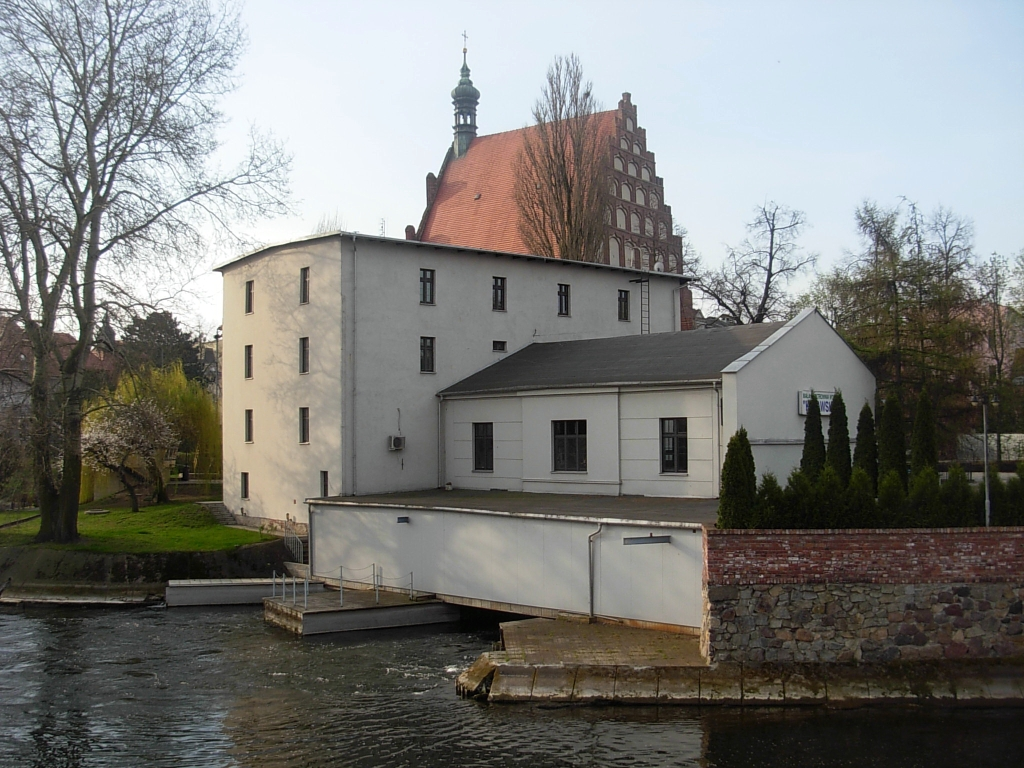
View with Bydgoszcz cathedral in the background

==== Wilhelm Kopp's dye house ====
Former dye house "Wilhelm Kopp" is located on the western banks of the leat channel. Address is Świętej Trójcy 4-6. The first dye house owned by Bydgoszcz industrialist William Kopp was established in 1878 in a nearby street, the company employed just 2 workers. In 1883, the owner significantly expanded its activity by purchasing a facility at Poznanska street 32. In 1893, the plant accidentally burned down, due to the misuse of gasoline, then utilized as a cleaning agent.

After 10 years of use of a tentavive place downtown, Wilhelm Kopp had to build a new plant in 1903, on a plot at Świętej Trójcy Street. The building has five storeys and an ancillary section. It has been constructed in bricks, following the industrial architecture characteristic of the late 19th century.

At the lower level were placed dye and steam engine boilers. The upper floors housed laundry facilities, gasoline sewage, ironing area, expedition and housing. Clothes were coming from several regional office branches (Chełmno, Grudziądz, Inowrocław and Toruń), they were washed in special washing machines, using gasoline as detergent that could remove coffee, tea, beer and wine stains. After washing and drying, clothes were ironed and packed. William Kopp's facility was regarded as exemplary in terms of fire protection. The plant experienced a period of prosperity at the beginning of the 20th century, providing laundry services to Bydgoszcz area, but also several to other cities like Grudziądz and Toruń. From 1904 to 1910, the company grew from 32 workers, of whom 26 were women, up to 60 people.

When William Kopp died in 1919, company ownership moved to his two daughters and six sons. In practice, only 3 sons (Rudolf Wilhelm Albert, Julius Otto Friedrich and Felix Ernst Max) ran the business. The plant successfully operated, under Kopp Family management, through the interwar period and past the German occupation period. After World War II, the factory was nationalized, taken over by state company "Pralchem" but eventually ceased business in the 1990s.

In 2002, during the revitalisation of Mill Island, the creation of a walking path along the leat channel has separated the building from the waterway, and in 2006 a footbridge over the leat has been built in front of the edifice, dedicated to singer Krzysztof Klenczon. The same year, the question of rebuilding the dye house into luxury apartments has been raised: the project would have created around 30 loft houses, an indoor swimming pool and a winter garden overlooking Mill Island, with a 300 m^{2} service center on the ground floor. However, the plan has never been realized. In 2011, a new owner suggested another project for a 126 rooms hotel with 126 rooms, a restaurant, a conference room, a wellness center and a winter garden on the roof to be completed by the end of 2013. This project is on hold for the time being.

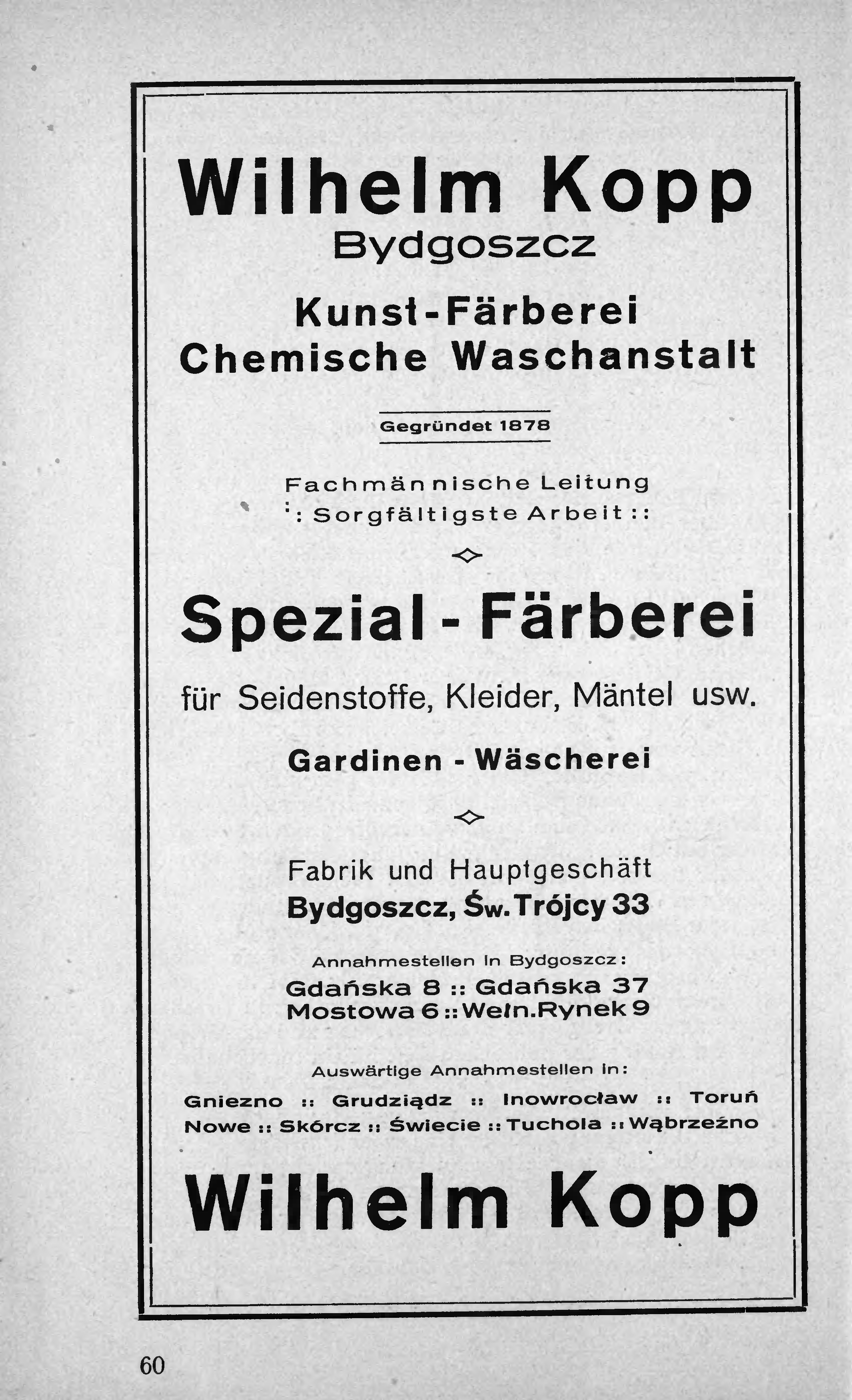
Advertising for Kopp's dye house ca 1928

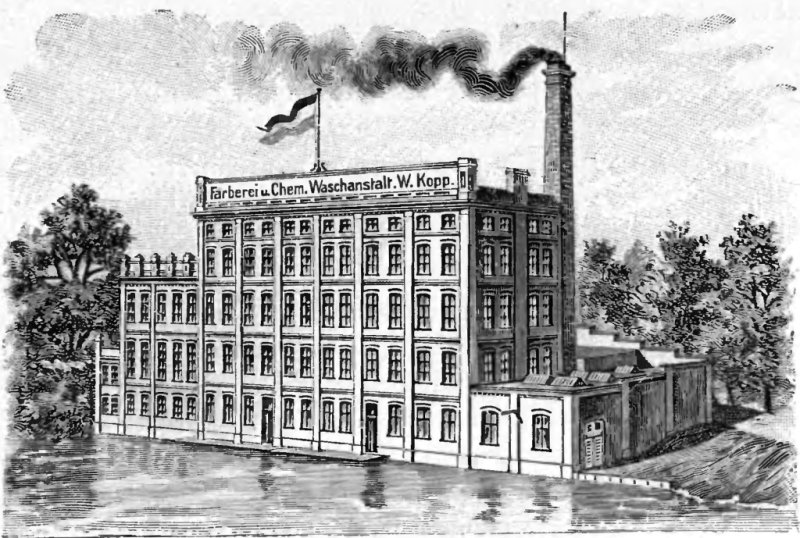
The dye house at the end of the 19th century

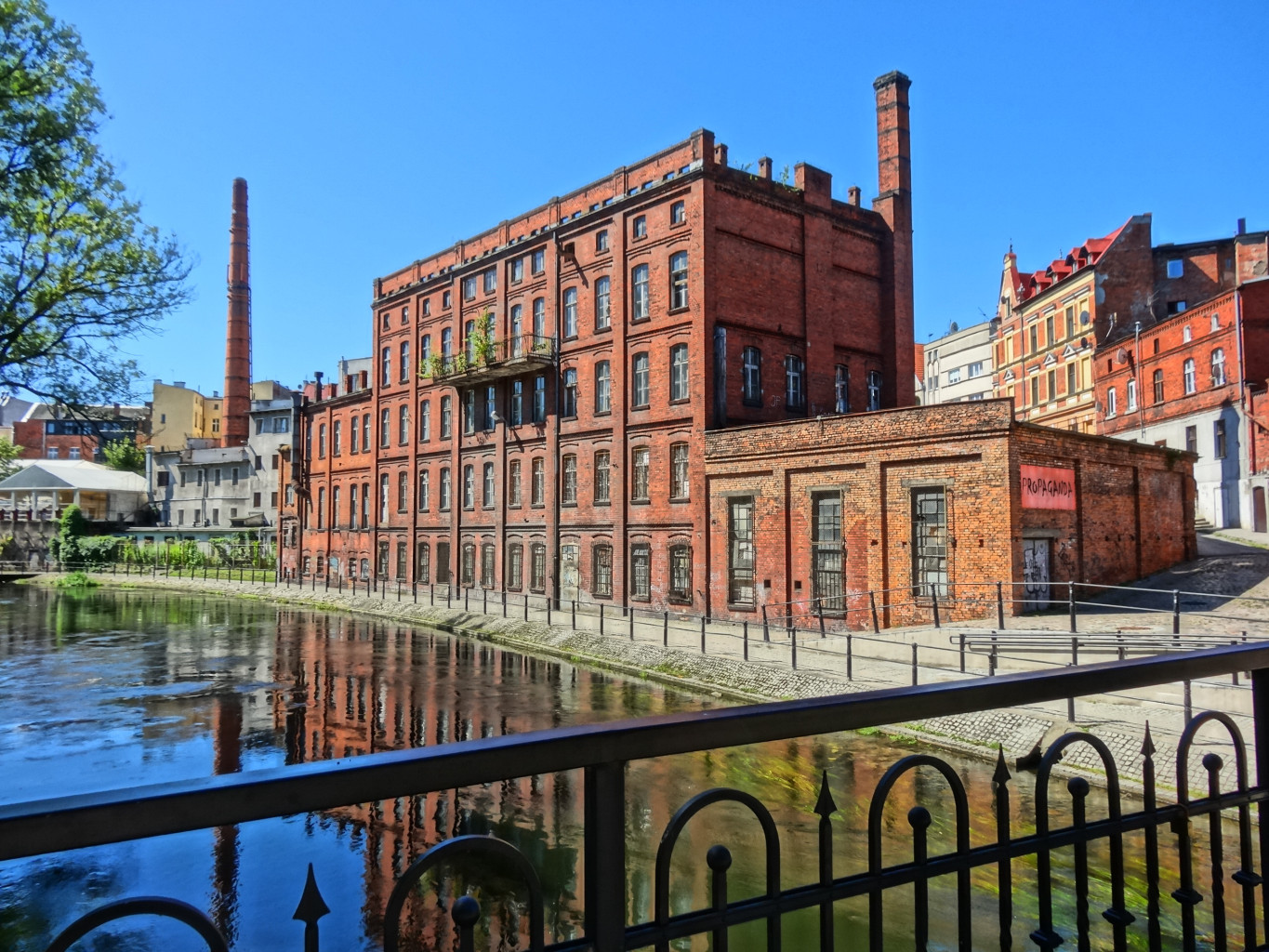
View from Mill Island

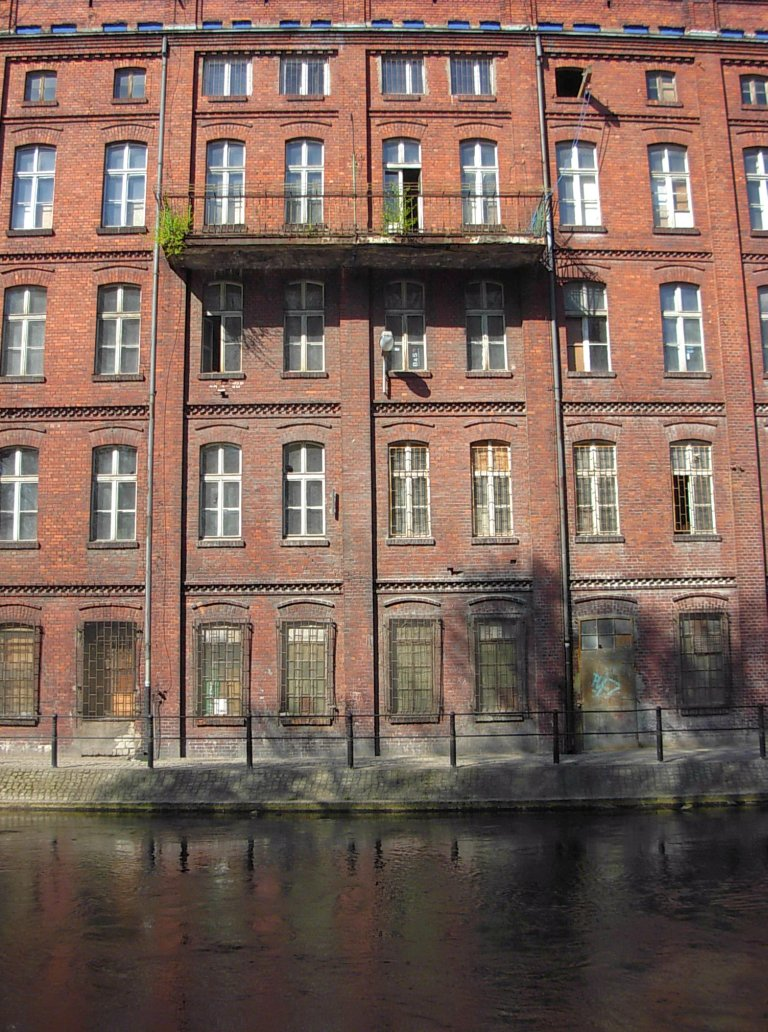
Main Facade

==== August Franke's spirit refinery ====
The founder of the distillery Franke was Carl August Franke, who came to Bydgoszcz in 1827 from Leszno. It was initially a small distillery producing rectified spirit. After Carl August's death in 1853, his son Hermann Franke took over the company. From this date, the firm underwent a stable and dynamic development. In 1857, the steam-powered distillation device had a capacity of 1000 liters: the 3hp steam machine, the first one installed in the city, had been produced by Friedrich Eberhard's workshops in Berliner Straße, Bydgoszcz.

In 1872, Hermann Franke launched at Podwale Street 11, new plants to produce pure rectified spirit, popular for liqueur making: daily production of spirits climbed up to about 3500 liters. His high performance business made Franke's company a monopoly in the supply of alcohol in Bromberg and surrounding areas; it also created the need to solve the problem of storage, especially in winter time. Franke bought for that in 1887 a plot, on the bank of leat river, and built there a tank facility capable of storing approximately 1 million liters of raw spirit (soon up to 1.75 million liters). In 1893, he also had built there a modern refinery along the stream, which, together with the factory in Podwale Street reached a daily production of about 10,000 liters of spirits a day. This figure was never exceeded the following years, due to a reducing demand. In the 1890s, decorated public baths facilities opened close to Franke's distillery plants. Hermann Franke was known as a philanthropist, committed to work for economic, cultural and social development in the city: he was made in 1900, "Honorary Citizen of the City of Bromberg. After Hermann Franke's death in 1913, the entire company passed into the hands of his son, Conrad, who ran the firm only four years, as he died prematurely in 1917, at age 52. The neighbouring building at Czartoryskiego street 6, housed a public-bath, owned by Franke's company, using warm water generated during spirit production. On an outside wall in a courtyard is placed a bas-relief "Children in a Bath" reminding this period.

The plant operated through the interwar period and the German occupation period, but under German ownership. After World War II, the factory has been nationalized and gradually ceased its activity.

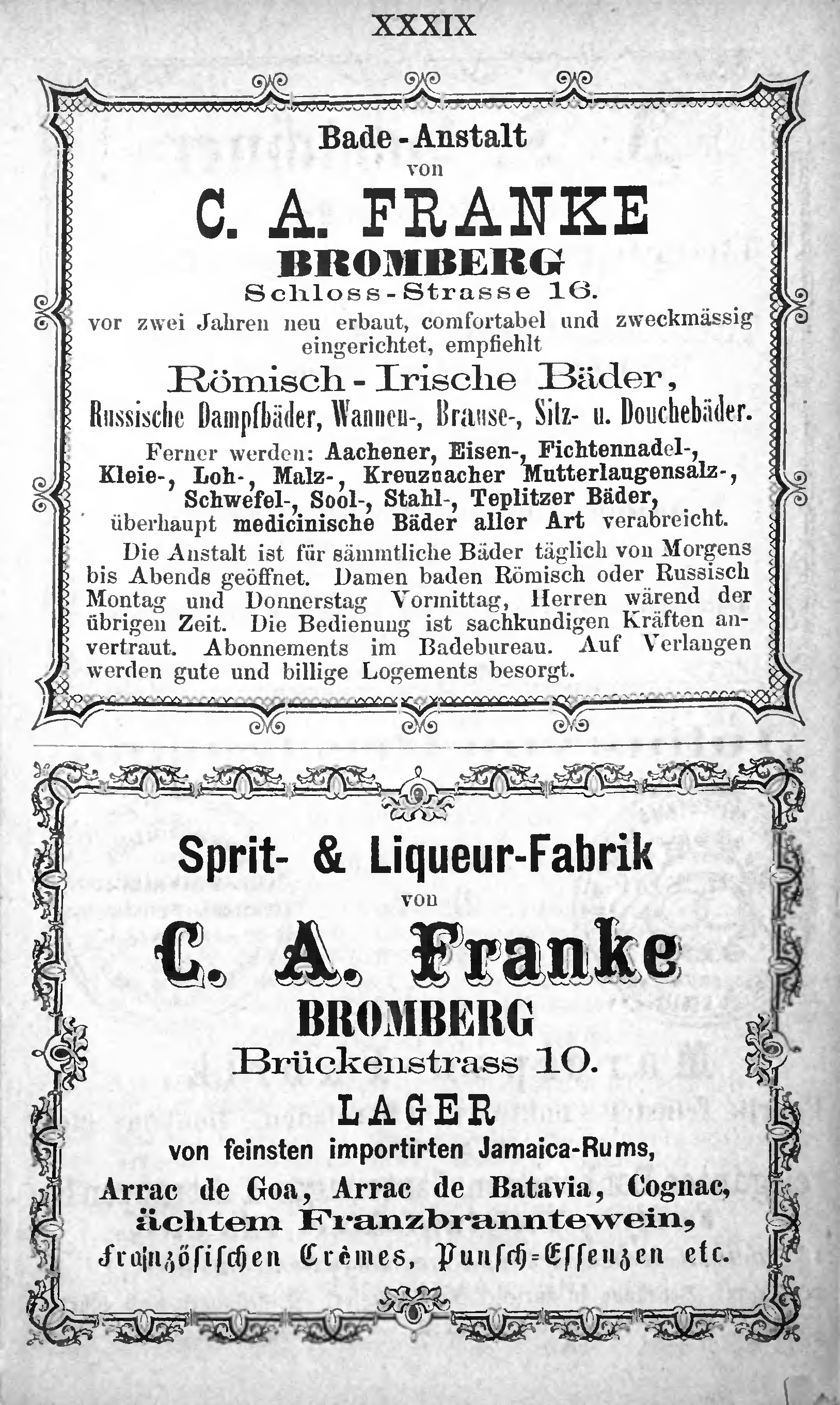
Advertising for CA Franke refinery ca 1876

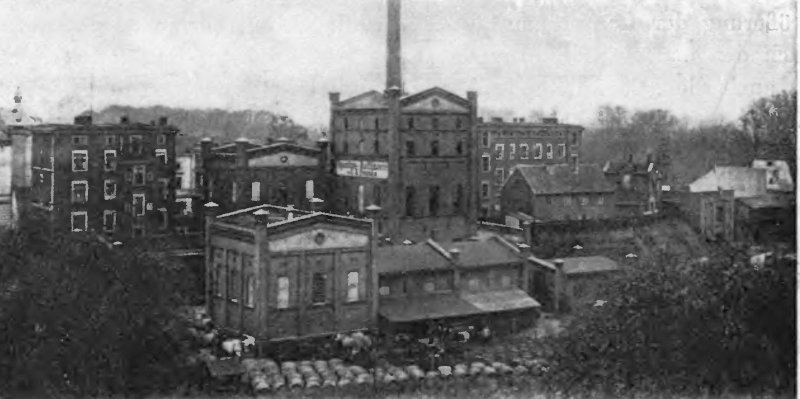
Refinery,1905

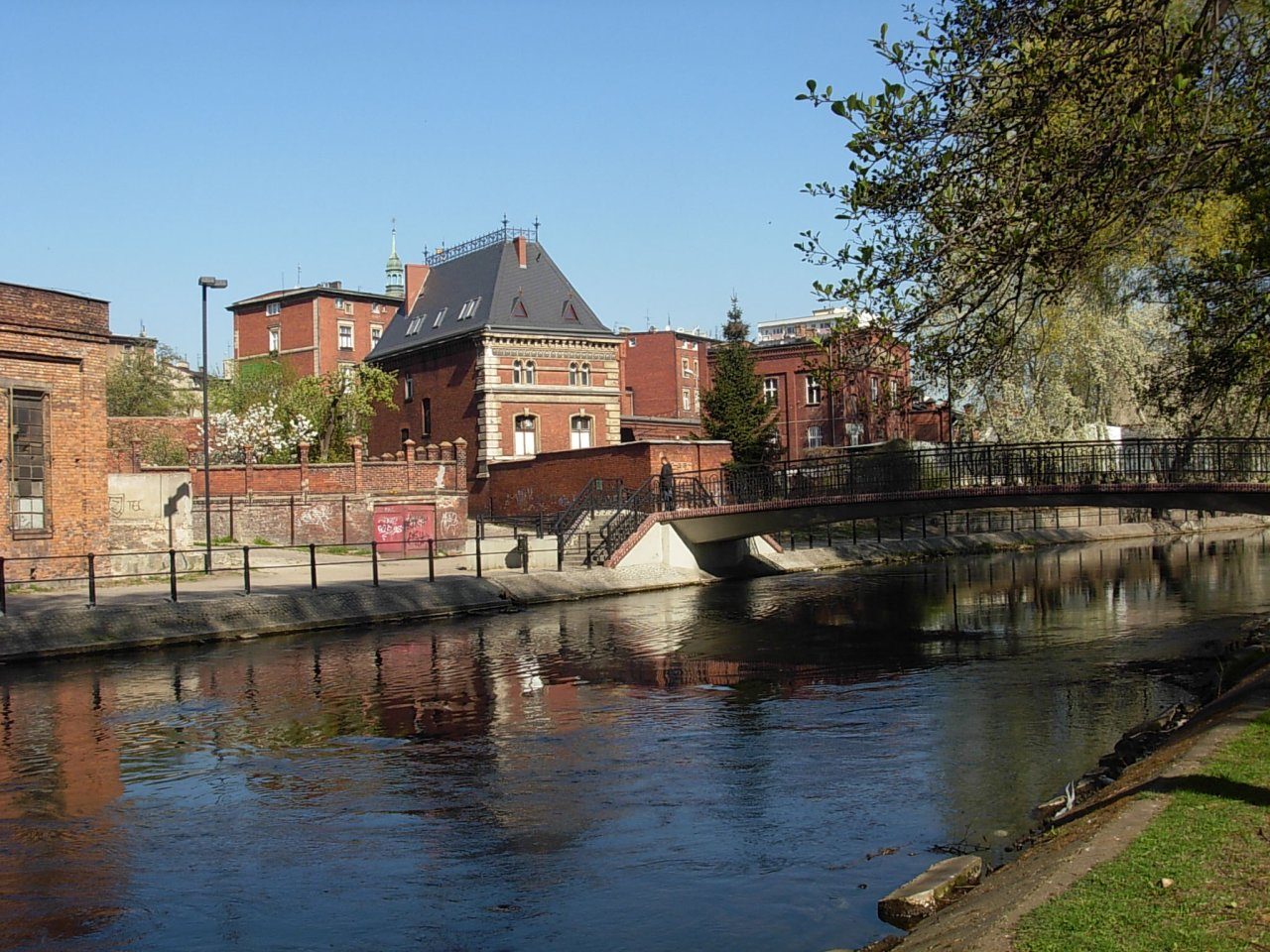
View from Mill island

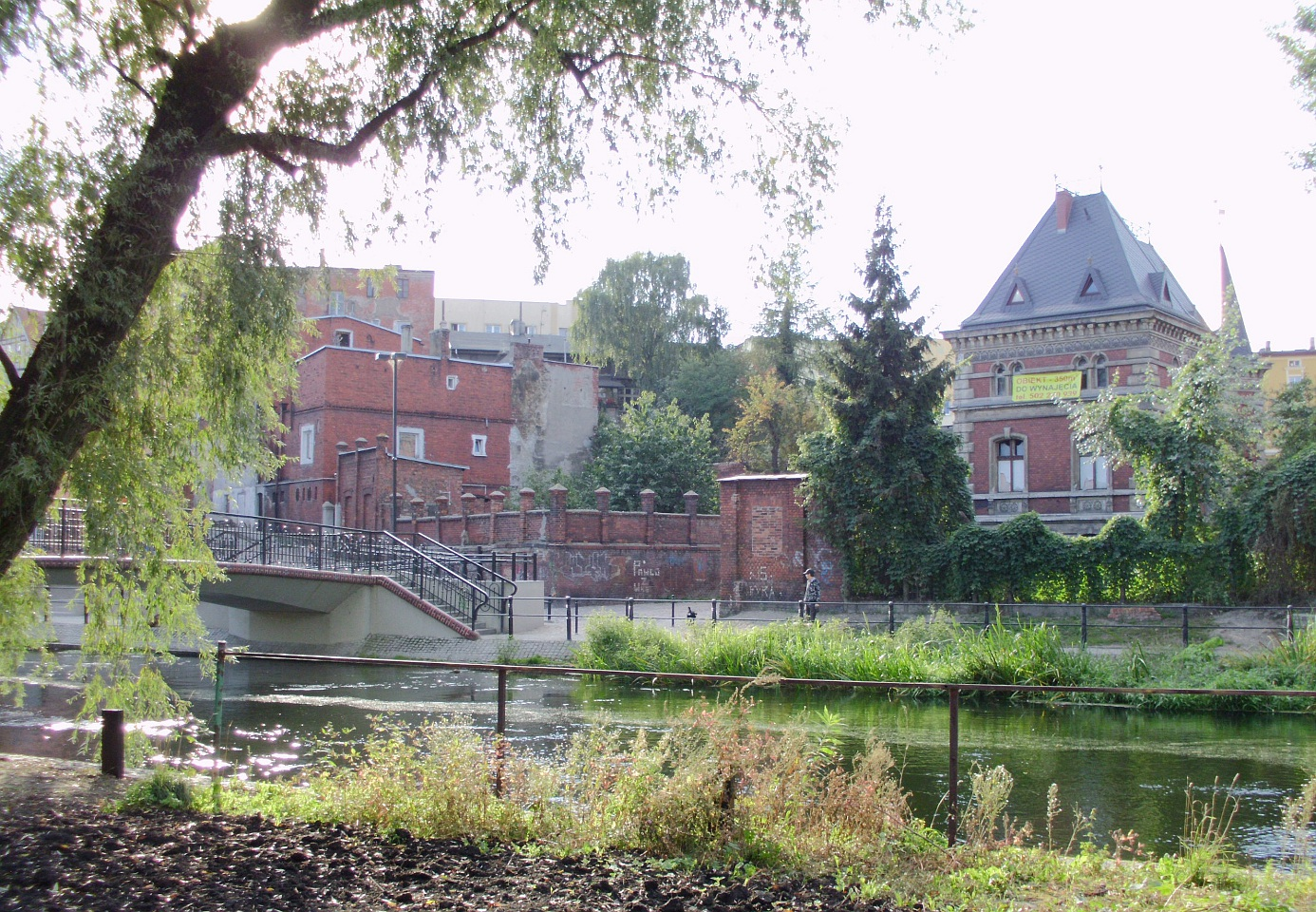
View from Mill Island

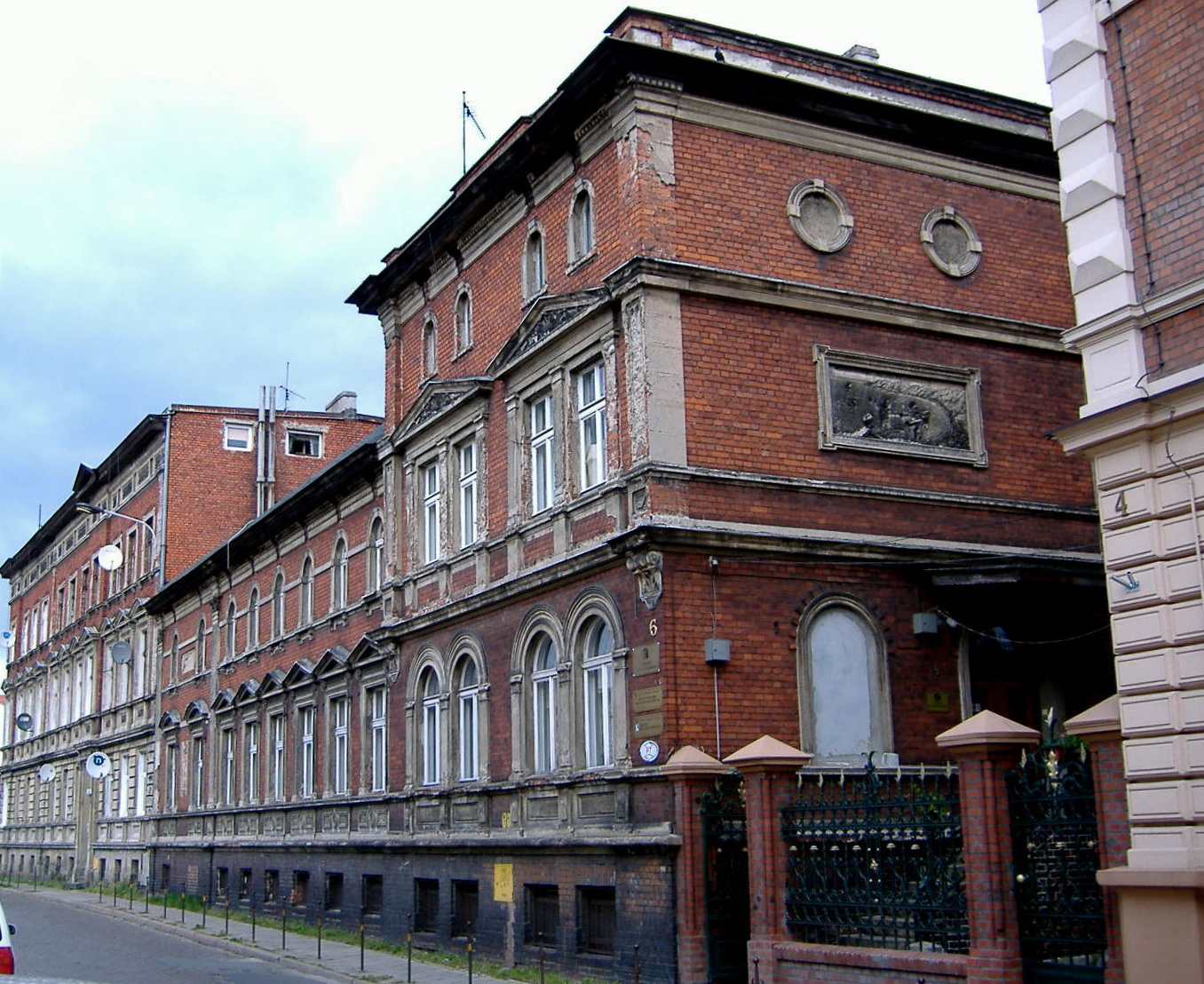
View from Czartoryskiego street, with the bas-relief on the right wall

=== Lock and weirs ===
==== City lock ====
Prior to the city lock, the river splits into two branches:

- one flows through the leat branch that wrapped Mill Island and feed two weirs, the hydropower plant "Kujawska", the "Międzywodzie kanał", and ends at the fish ladder near the Marina;
- one is the canalized Brda river.

The water level difference between those branches is 3m.

The original wooden sluice was built in 1774 when the Bydgoszcz Canal was put into service. It was rebuilt many times due to the difficult conditions and the limited durability of the building material. In 1788 the sluice collapsed, and in 1792 a new wooden sluice was set up, despite efforts to use brick or stone: the structure collapsed again in 1803, to be replaced by a wooden contraption in 1805. In the following years, this event pattern happened repeatedly, until 1882, when decision was made to build aside a brick lock with an unusual trapezoidal shape.

Another lock, which has survived until today, was set west of the sluice and it was put into service in 1915. It was part of a new section Bydgoszcz Canal, fitted to 400-ton barges standards, along with two newly built large locks, in Okole and Czyżkówko. The same year, the old trapezoidal lock was filled and its stone revetment is still visible today at Marcinkowski Street. In 2014, to celebrate the 240th anniversary of the Bydgoszcz Canal, embankments and walls of the old lock chamber have been unveiled and exposed in an educational and historical purposes, as a part of the revitalisation project of the Brda river.

In 2005, the city lock (comprising locks, buildings, engine room, wheelhouse) was listed on the Kuyavian-Pomeranian Voivodeship Monuments Heritage List (no. 601433, reg. A/901/1-6, December 9, 2005). In 2014-2015 an overhaul of the city lock was planned, including the set up of a sound system and video monitoring.

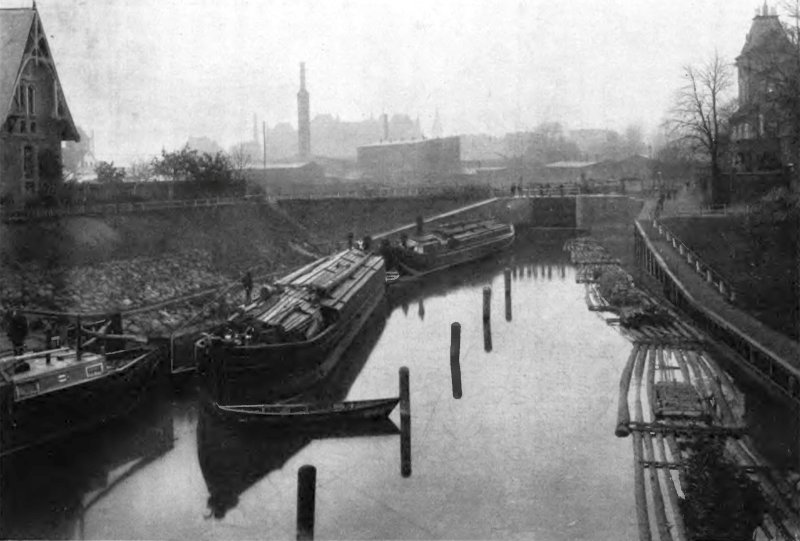
Lock in 1905

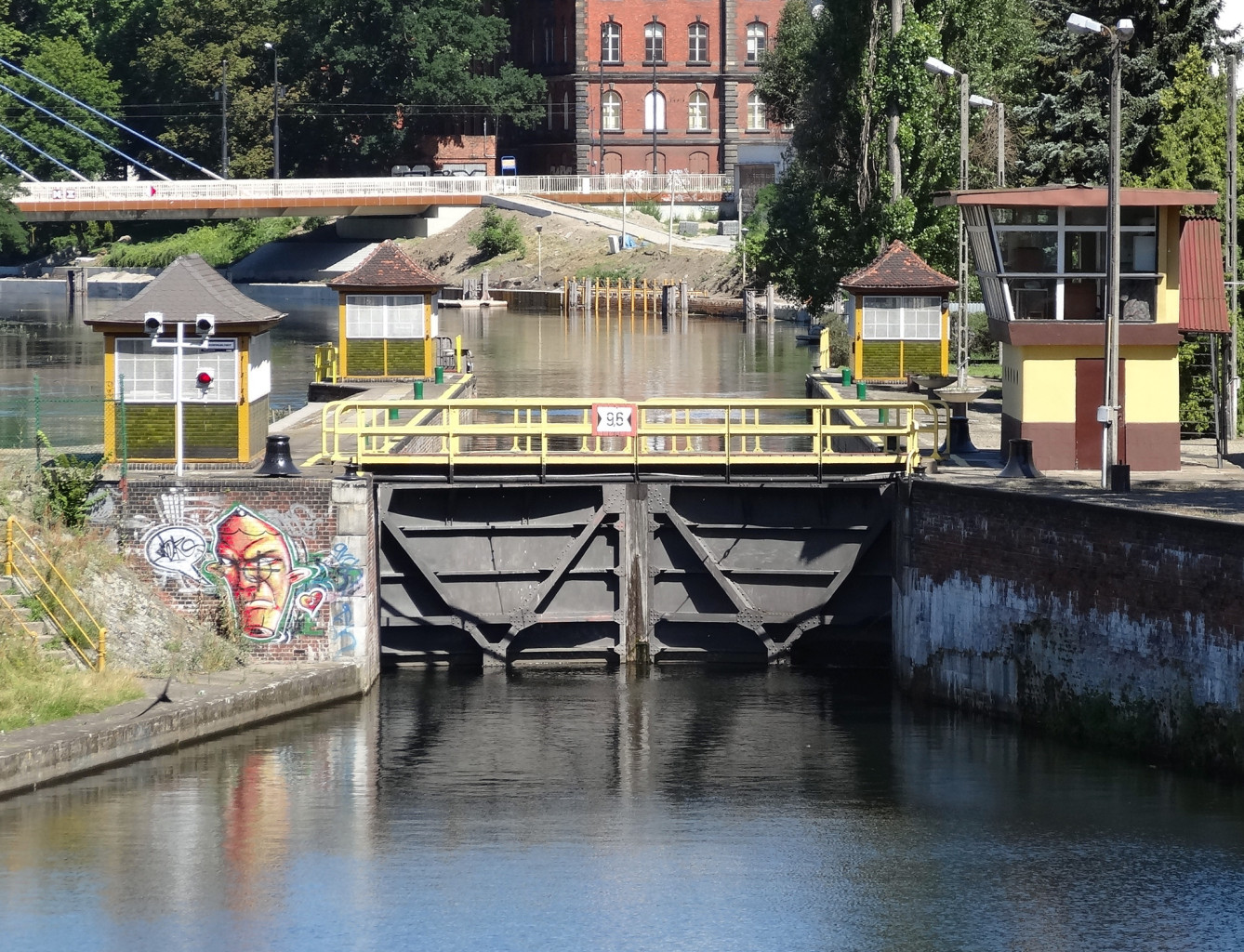
Northbound view

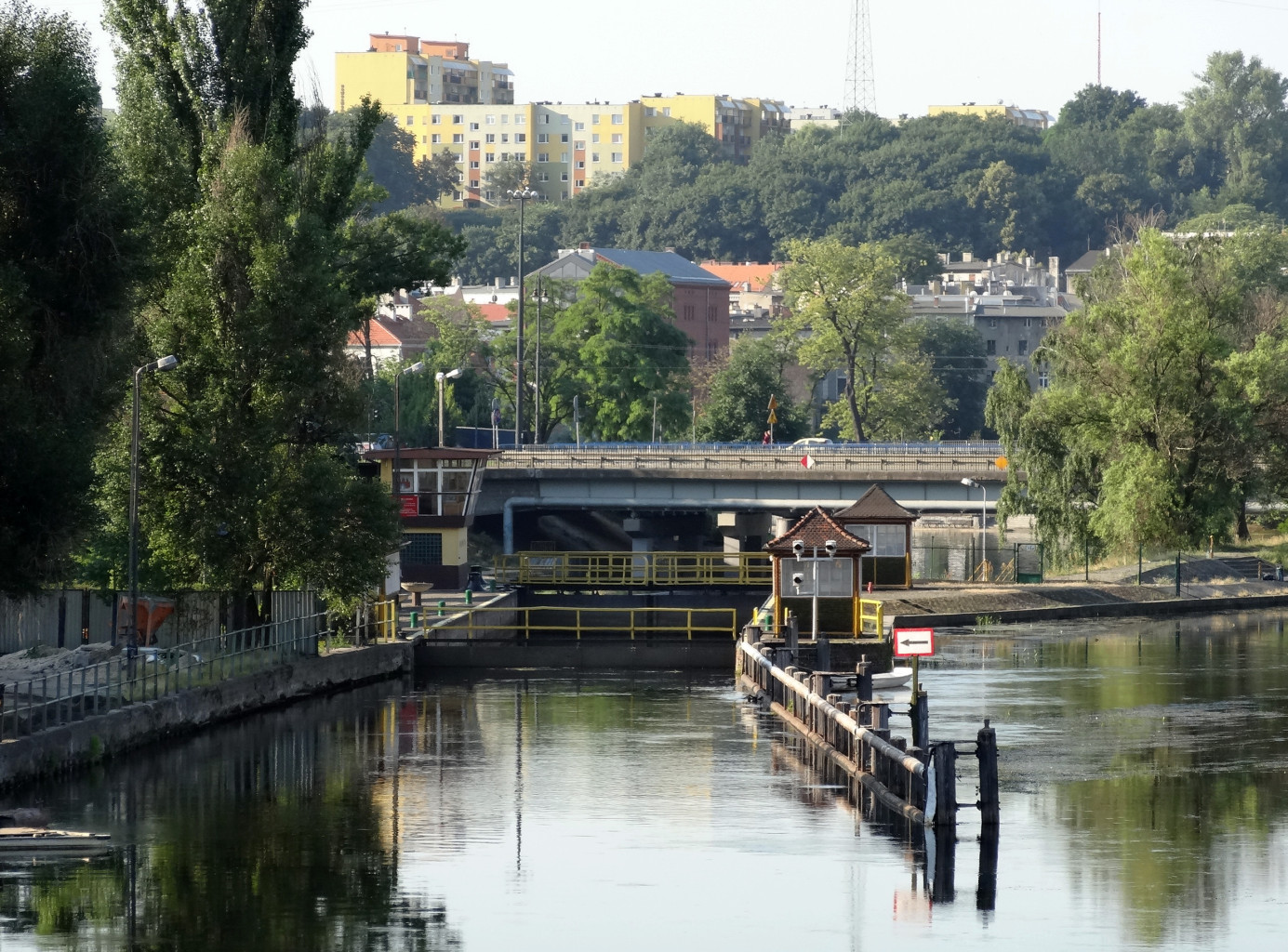
Southbound view

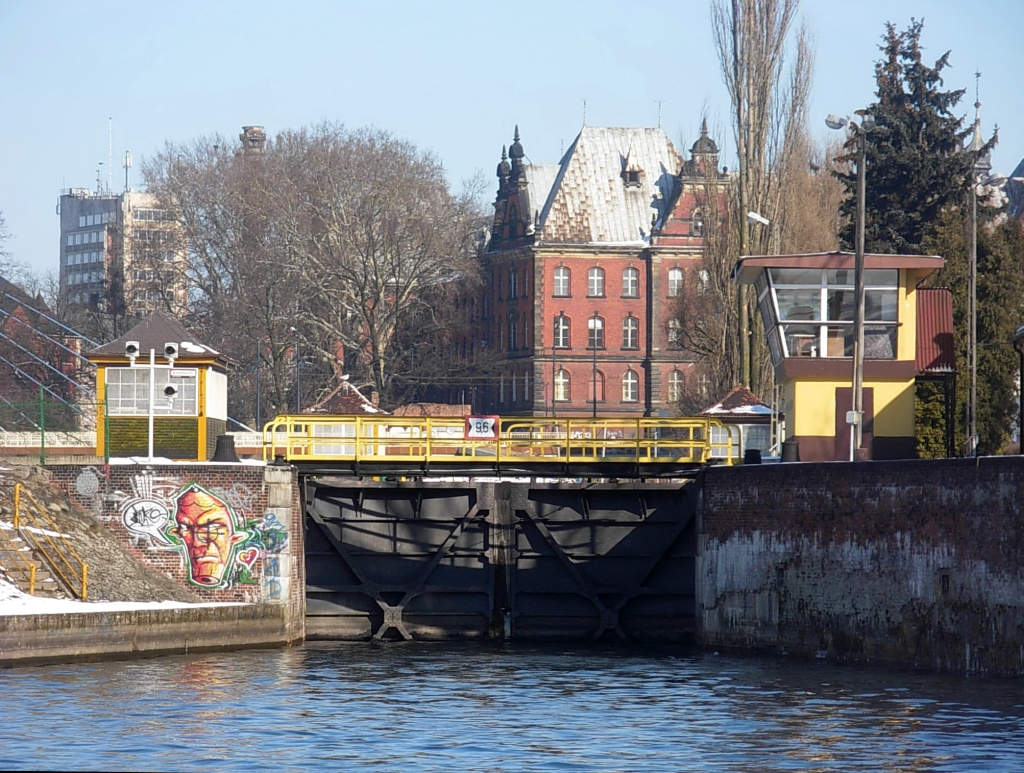
View with Old Prussian Eastern Railway building in the background

==== Jaz Farny ====
Jaz Farny (Parish weir) is located between the leat branch of Mill Island and the Brda river. It lies in immediate proximity of Bydgoszcz Cathedral ("St. Martin and Nicholas"), hence its name: "Kościół farny" in Polish is the "parish church". Next to this weir is the hydroelectric plant "Kujawska".

At this place, in the 14th century, was located Bydgoszcz's first dam, equipped with a water wheel driving a grain mills.

The current weir has been built in 1899, then rebuilt in 1929, 1970 and 1996. In 2014-2015 is planned a thorough overhaul of this weir, part of the revitalisation project of Brda river. In 1995, the Farna weir has been listed on Kuyavian-Pomeranian Voivodeship Monuments Heritage List (no. A/438/1, February 16, 1995)

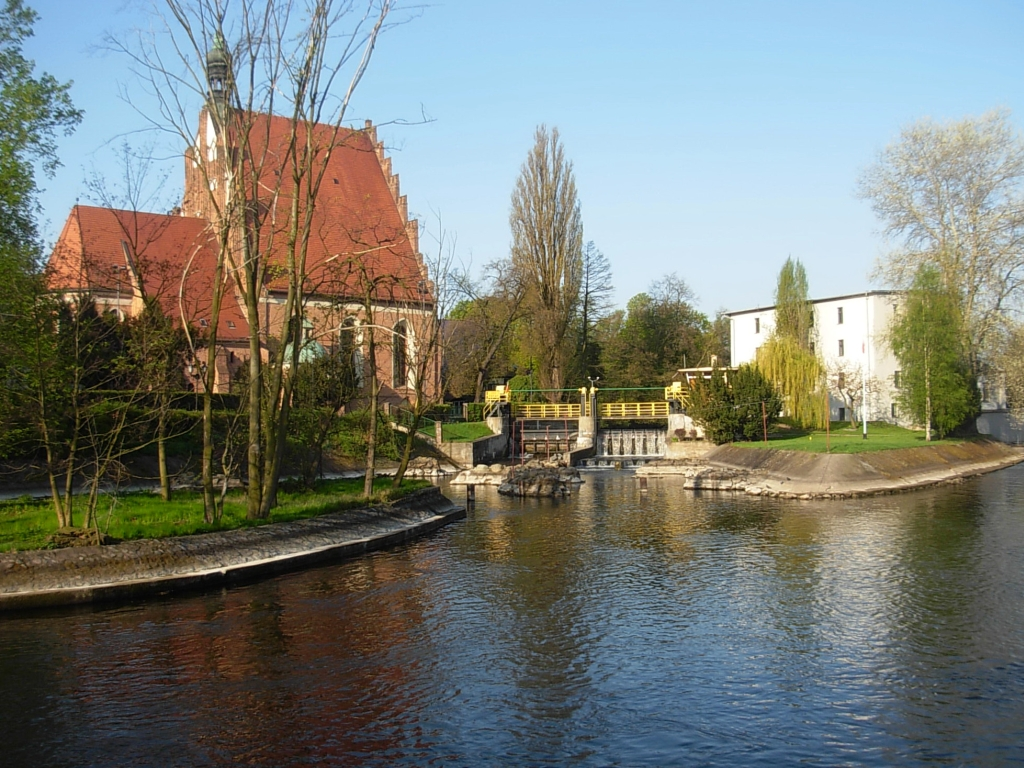
The weir with the cathedral (left) and the hydro plant (right)

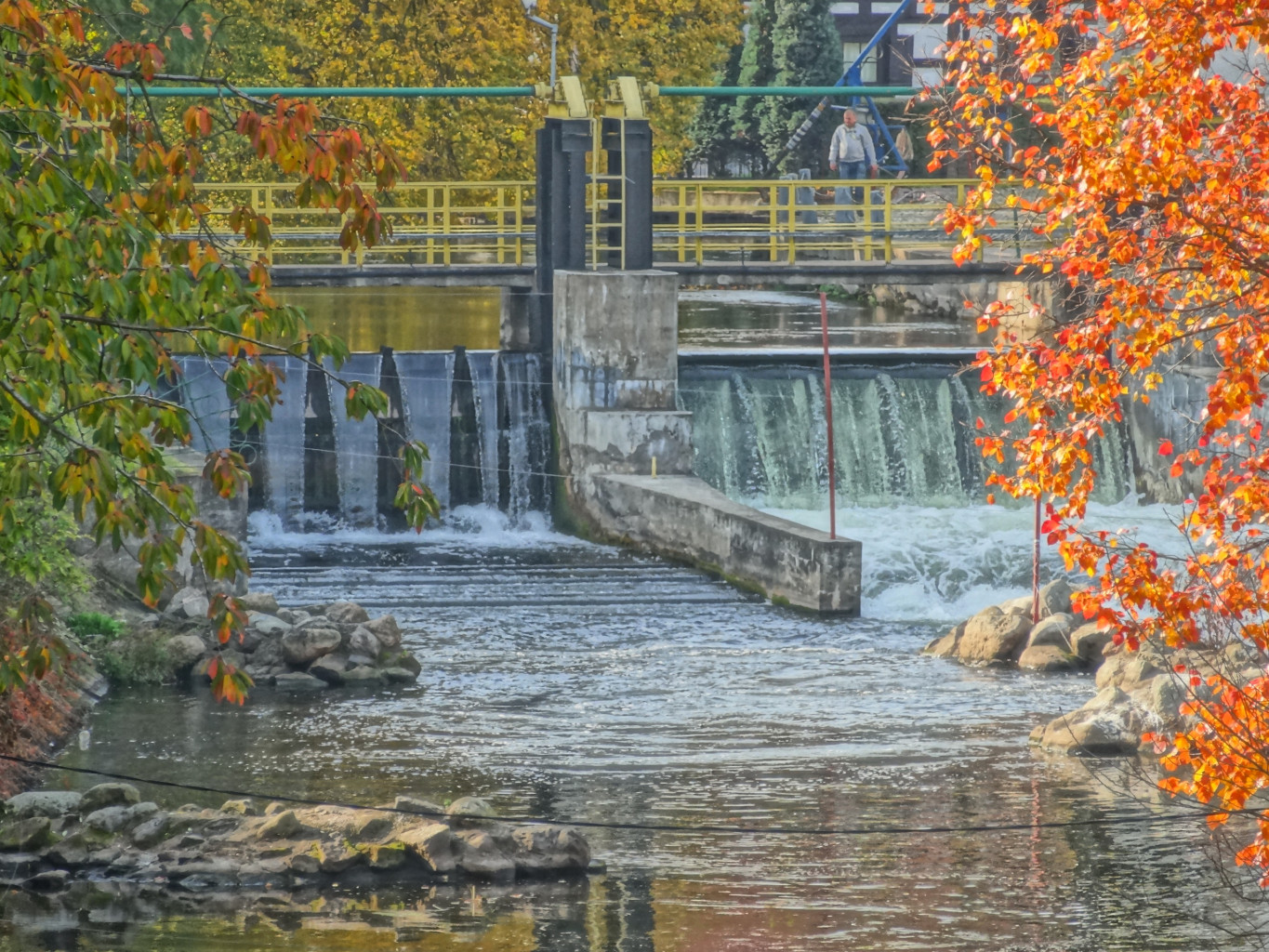
Detailed view

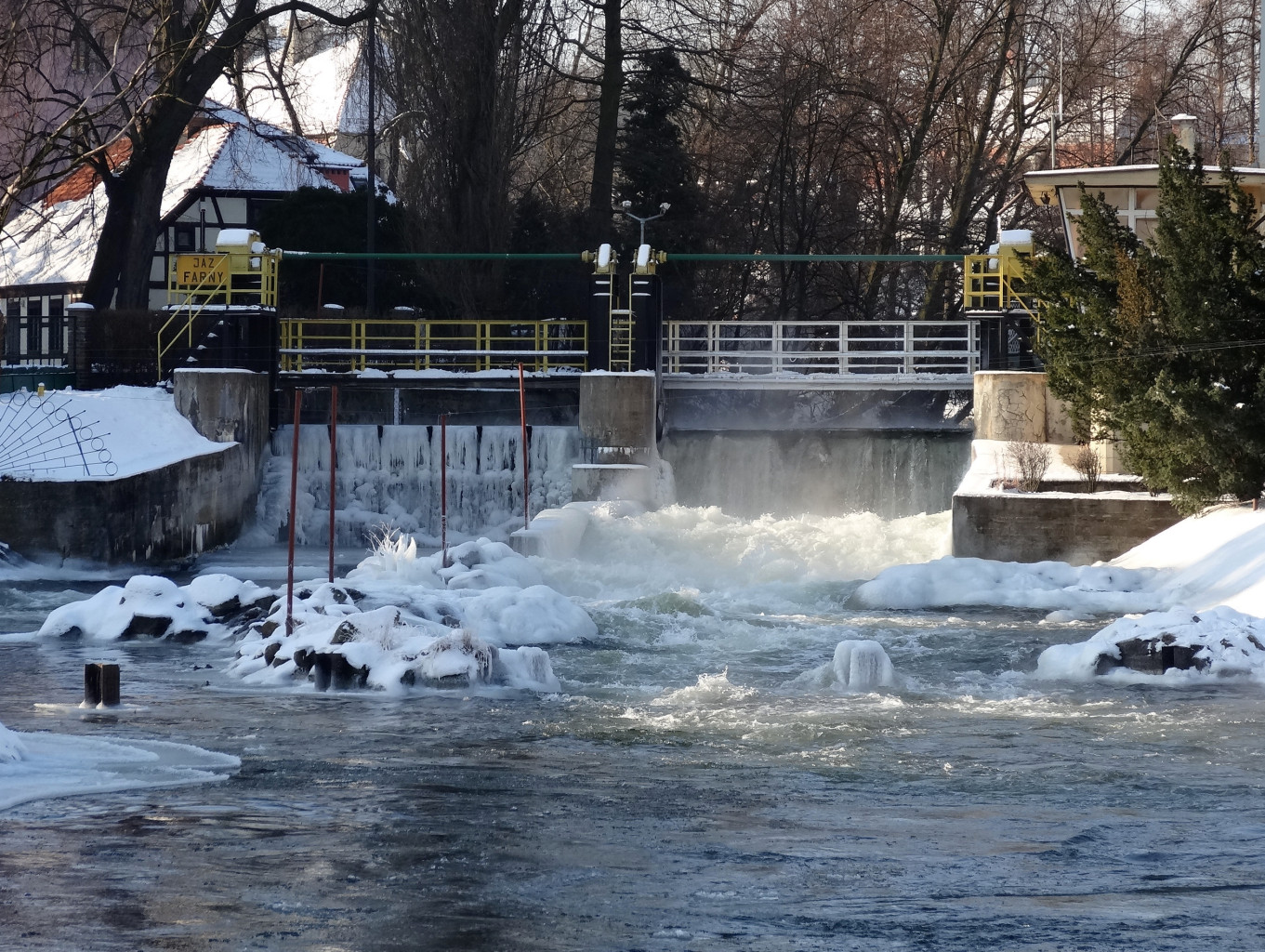
Winter time

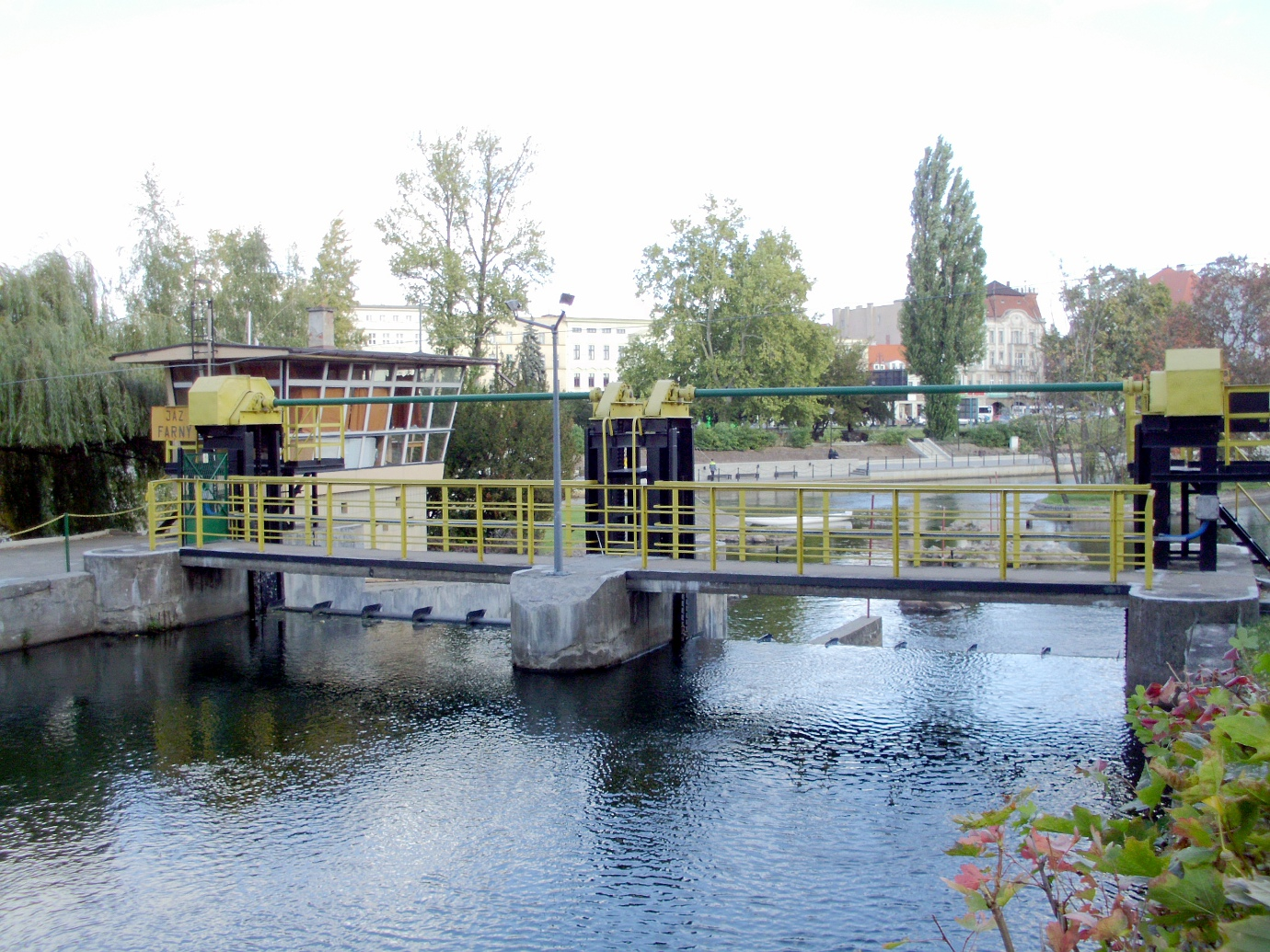
Opposite view

==== Jaz Ulgowy ====
Jaz Ulgowy (Small weir) is located between the leat branch of Mill Island and the Brda at the level of the marina, upstream from Farna weir. It has been built in 1890, during the reconstruction of Mill Island. The actual structure dates back to 1920. In 1964, "Płockie Przedsiębiorstwo Robót Mostowych" Company completed the 10.5 m-long bridge that parallels the weir. It has been renovated in 1994. In 1995, the Ulgowa weir has been listed on Kuyavian-Pomeranian Voivodeship Monuments Heritage List (no. A/438/1, February 16, 1995)

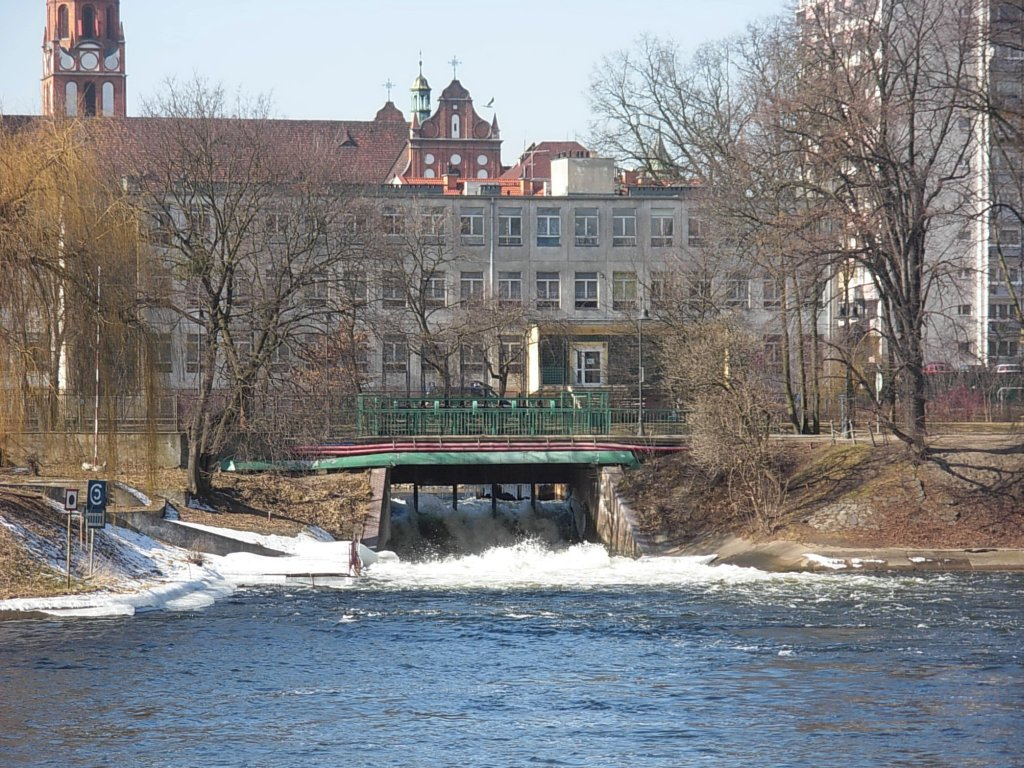
View from the Brda river

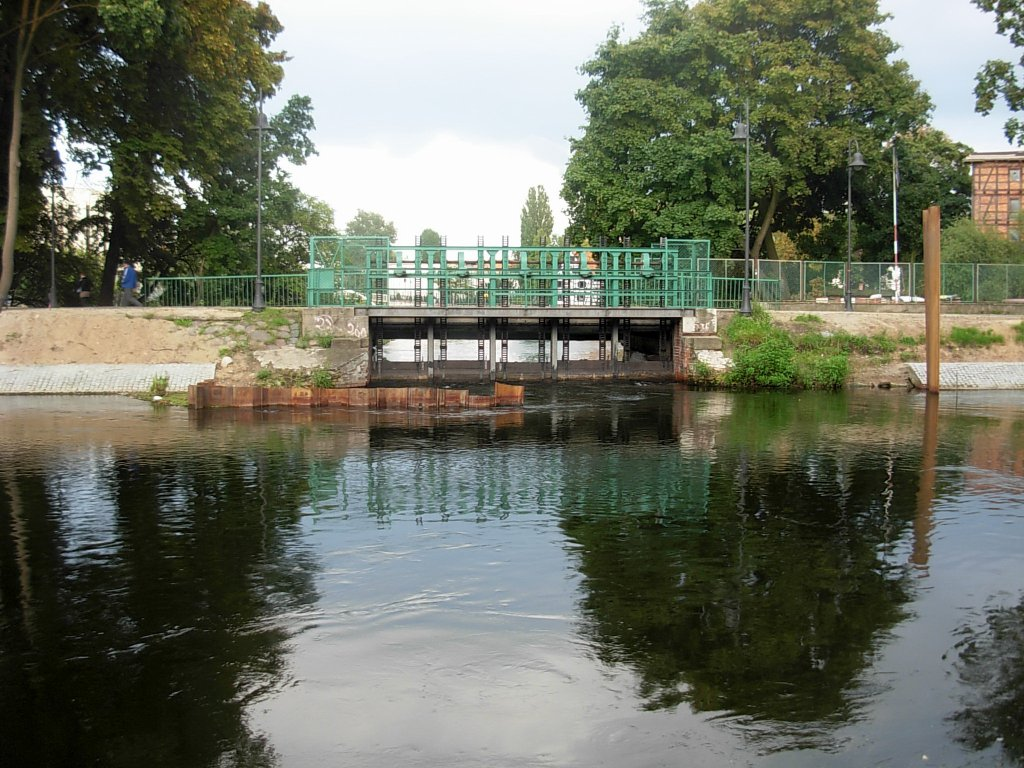
View from the leat branch

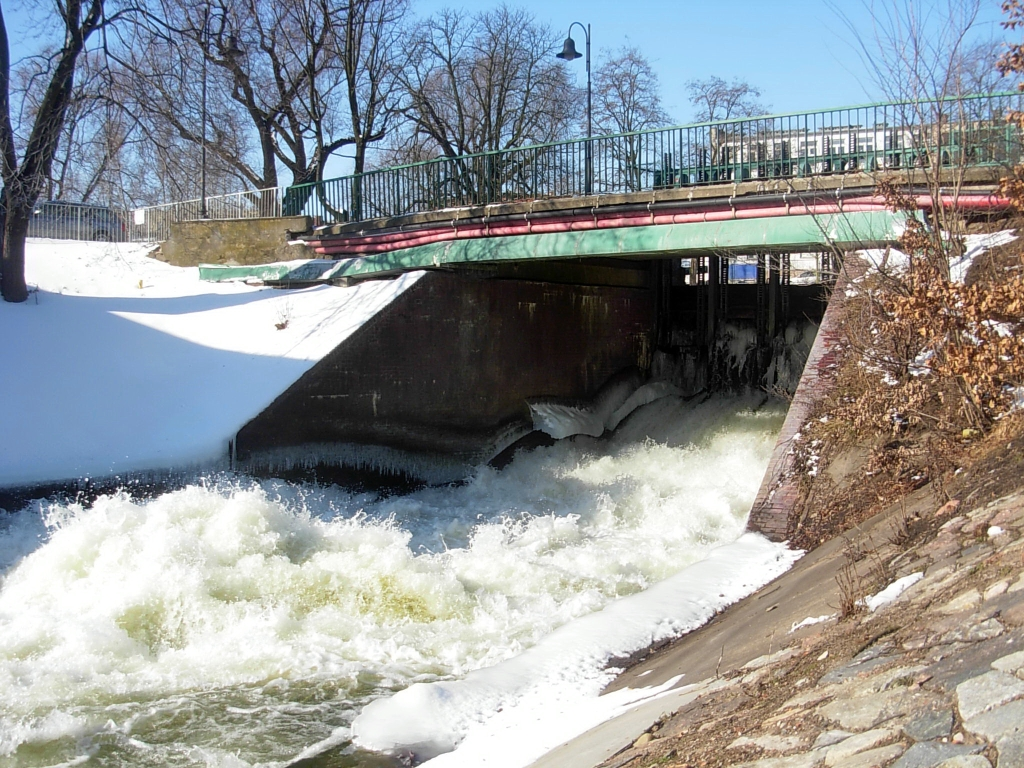
Winter time

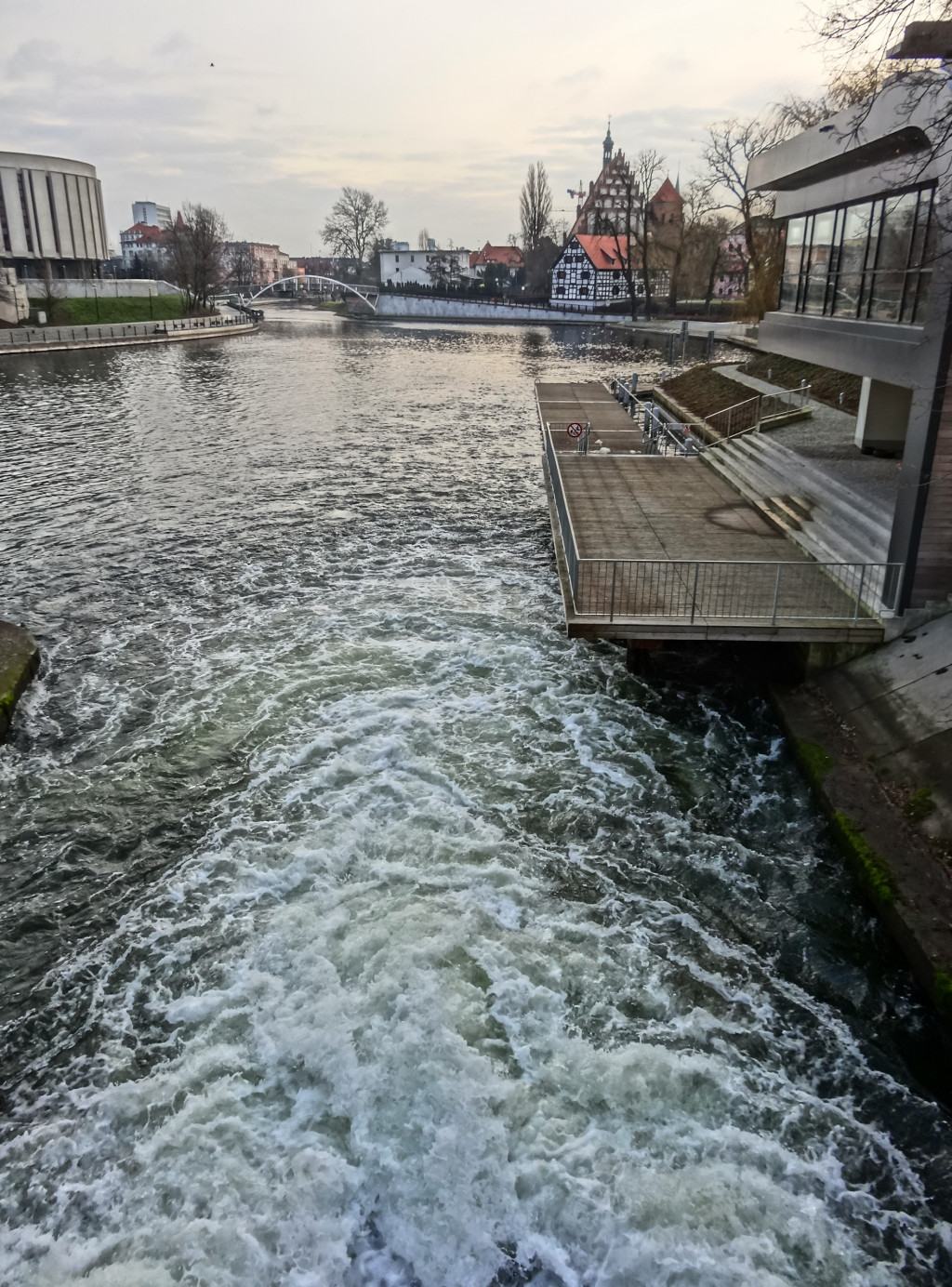
Opposite view to the cathedral

=== Other buildings ===
Building	Address	Date of construction	Remarks	Picture
European Money Museum	4 Mennica Street	17th century, 1786, 2008	In 1595 a private mint was set up on the site of barn buildings. In 1613, it became a royal mint, then called State Mint after the death of King Sigismund III. Rebuilt in 1786 for the use of Mr Zink, a tanner, it was a residential building, for employees working at a nearby mill. At the end of the 19th century, it was an accommodation used for housing Mills' officials. In 2008, it has been thoroughly renovated by the District Museum and turned into the European Money Museum.	
Museum Education Center	6 Mennica Street	1775-1800	The house has been built for the administration of the mills, then rebuilt at the end of turn of the 19th century. Since 2009, it houses a number of educational activities (lessons, workshops, lectures, meetings with authors, field games, shows and museum presentations).	
Leon Wyczółkowski's House	7 Mennica Street	1899	Built as a residential house for mills' officials in 1899. In 1975, its ownership moved to the district museum of Bydgoszcz, which transformed it into a museum dedicated to painter Leon Wyczółkowski, with reconstructed interiors of his time.	
Miller's House	8 Mennica Street	1774	Built as the residence for mill workers in 1774. In 1979, its ownership moved to the district museum of Bydgoszcz. Since 2008, it houses the Museum Information Centre (this house is a reconstruction, original one was dismantled).	
Hotel Przystań Bydgoszcz	2 Tamka Street	2012	Hotel Przystań ("marina, harbour") complex has been erected in 2002, with 22 rooms and a catering hall, on a design by office "APA Rokiccy". The building also houses part of administrative offices and marina sports club area: training room, storing for 16 rowboats, 5 motorboats and 80 canoes, a repair shop. A mooring pier onto the Brda river for 12 boats is attached to the hotel's wharf, at the falls of the Ulgowa weir.	

=== Venice of Bydgoszcz ===
The history of the Venice of Bydgoszcz began in the 19th century, when, along the Brda river waterfront, many houses, workshops and factories were built. The main advantage of the location was the easy access to the water as well as being in the city center. Initially, the areas located directly on the river were used as gardens, but around 1870 a lot of the construction of buildings by the river started to be erected. In the end, the landscape in the Venice of Bydgoszcz turned to residential and industrial buildings. The owners of the townhouses were merchants, craftsmen or manufacturers. In workshops were conducted various activities:

- cigarettes factory,
- chocolate factory and confectionery "Lucullus" (1925-1939),
- bakeries, slaughterhouses, printing (e.g. "Dziennika Bydgoskiego"),
- dyeing (Wilhelm Kopp's dye house),
- distilery (August Franke's spirit refinery),
- sawmilling,
- restaurants.

At the beginning of the 20th century, the area, due to its original layout became a tourist attraction in Bydgoszcz, especially among artists (F. Gajewski, Jerzy Rupniewski, O. Sager, E. Kwiatkowski, B. Nowicki, A. Grześk-Męczyńska, Leon Płoszay, F. Konitzer, F. Brzęczkowski, Józef Pieniążek, K. Zwichel). Since the 1990s, and more even since the revitalisation of Mill Island, the place has become more and more attractive in terms of tourism and leisure.

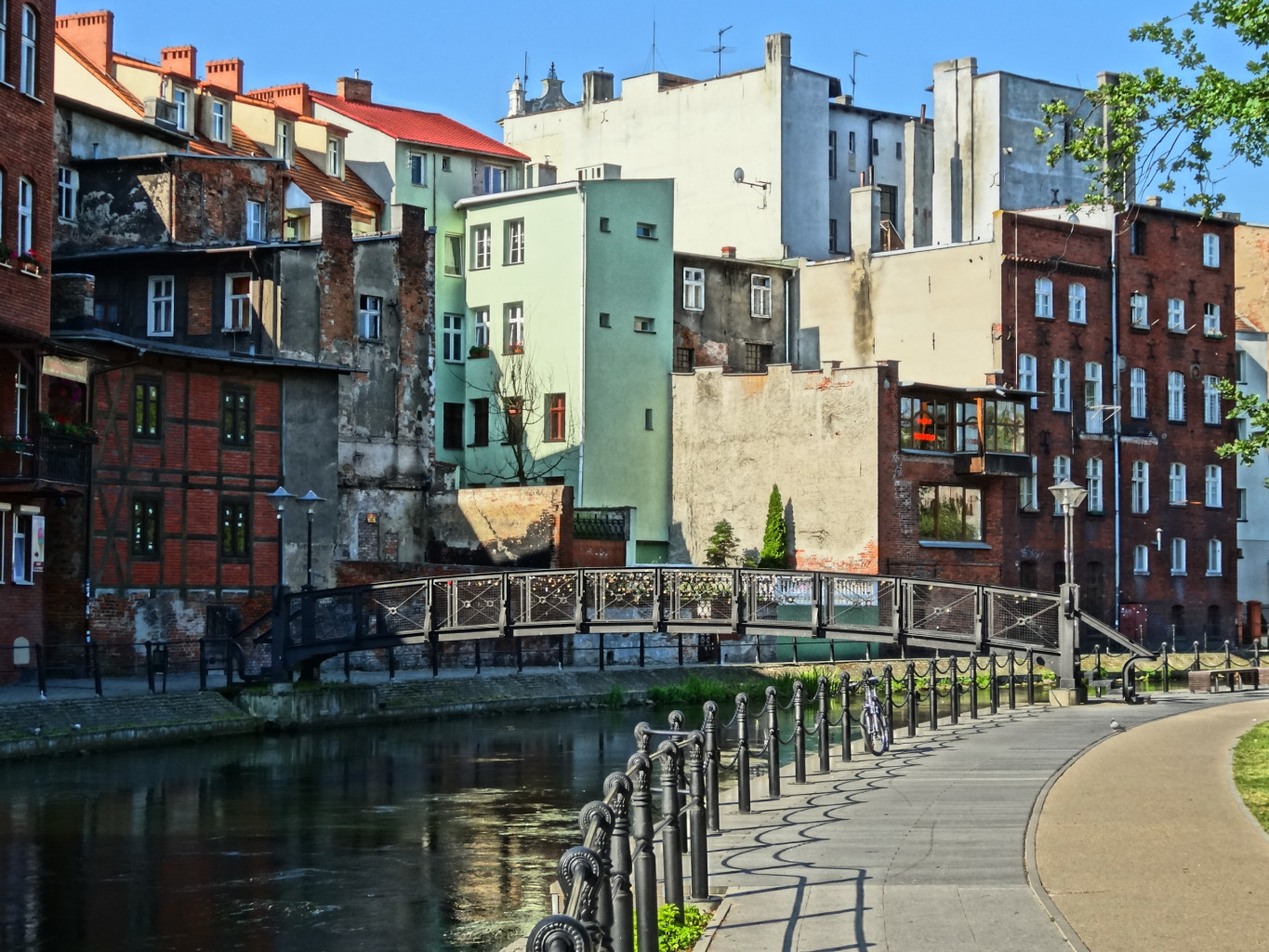
Southern part

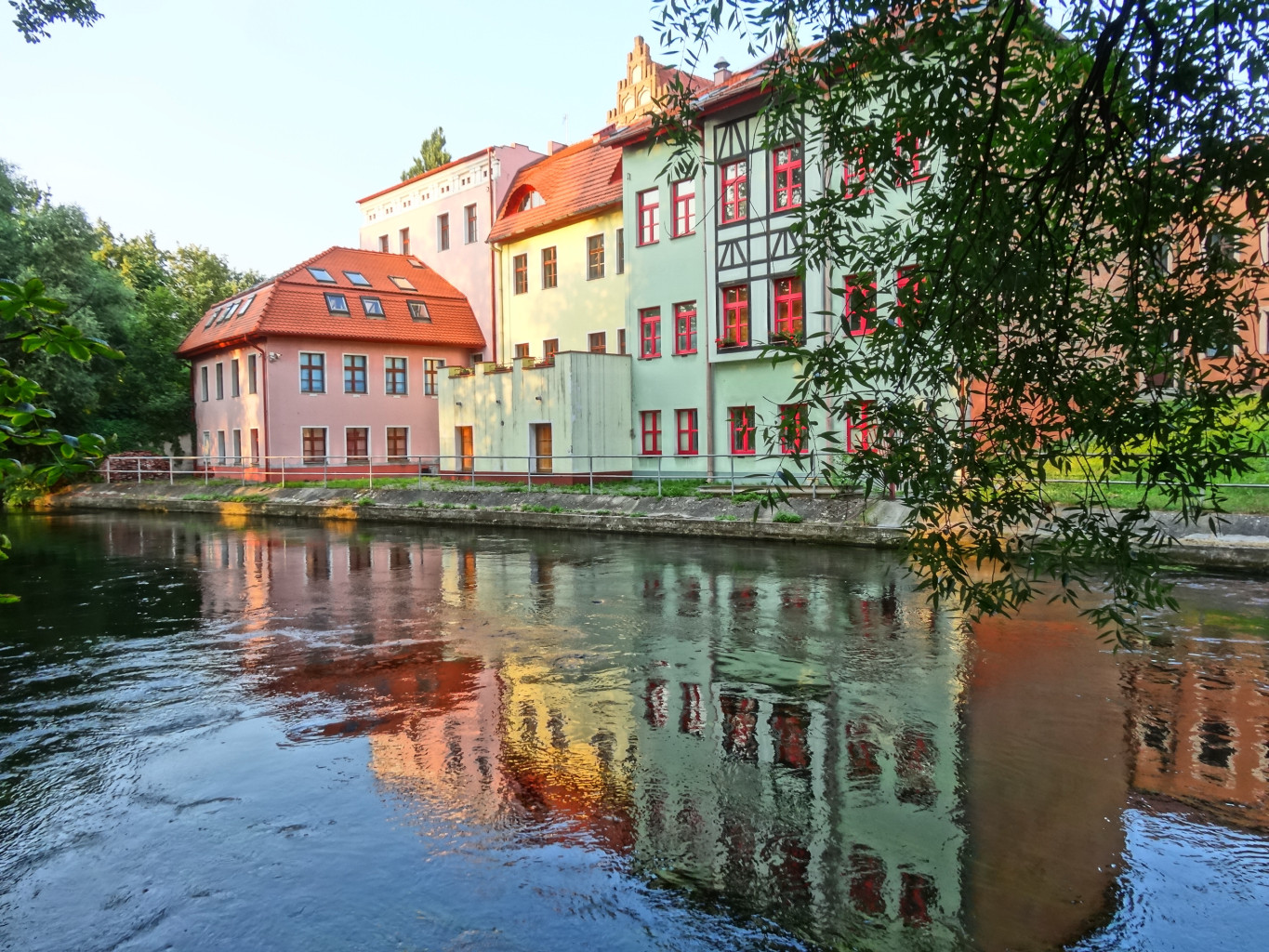
Eastern part

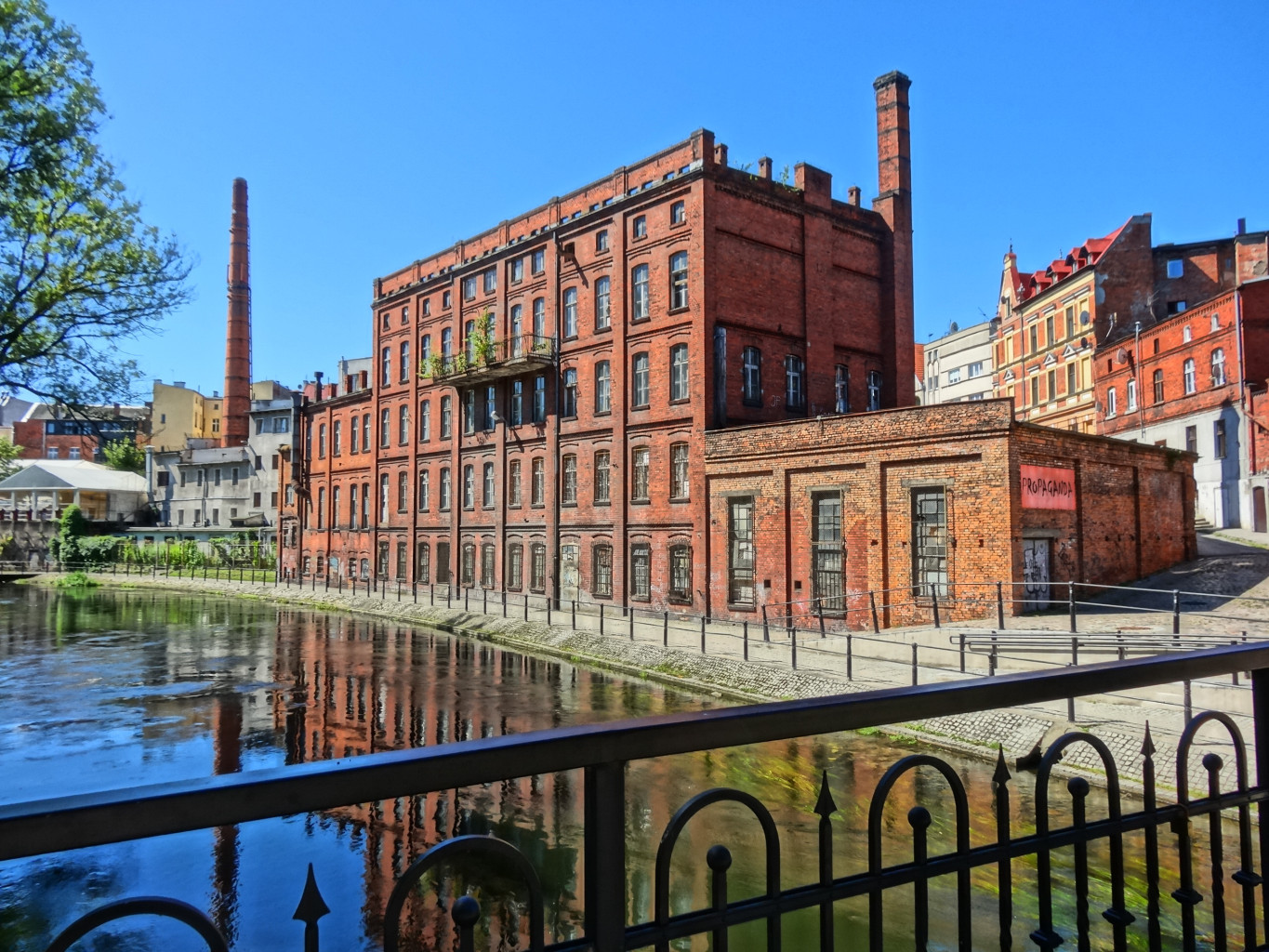
Western part

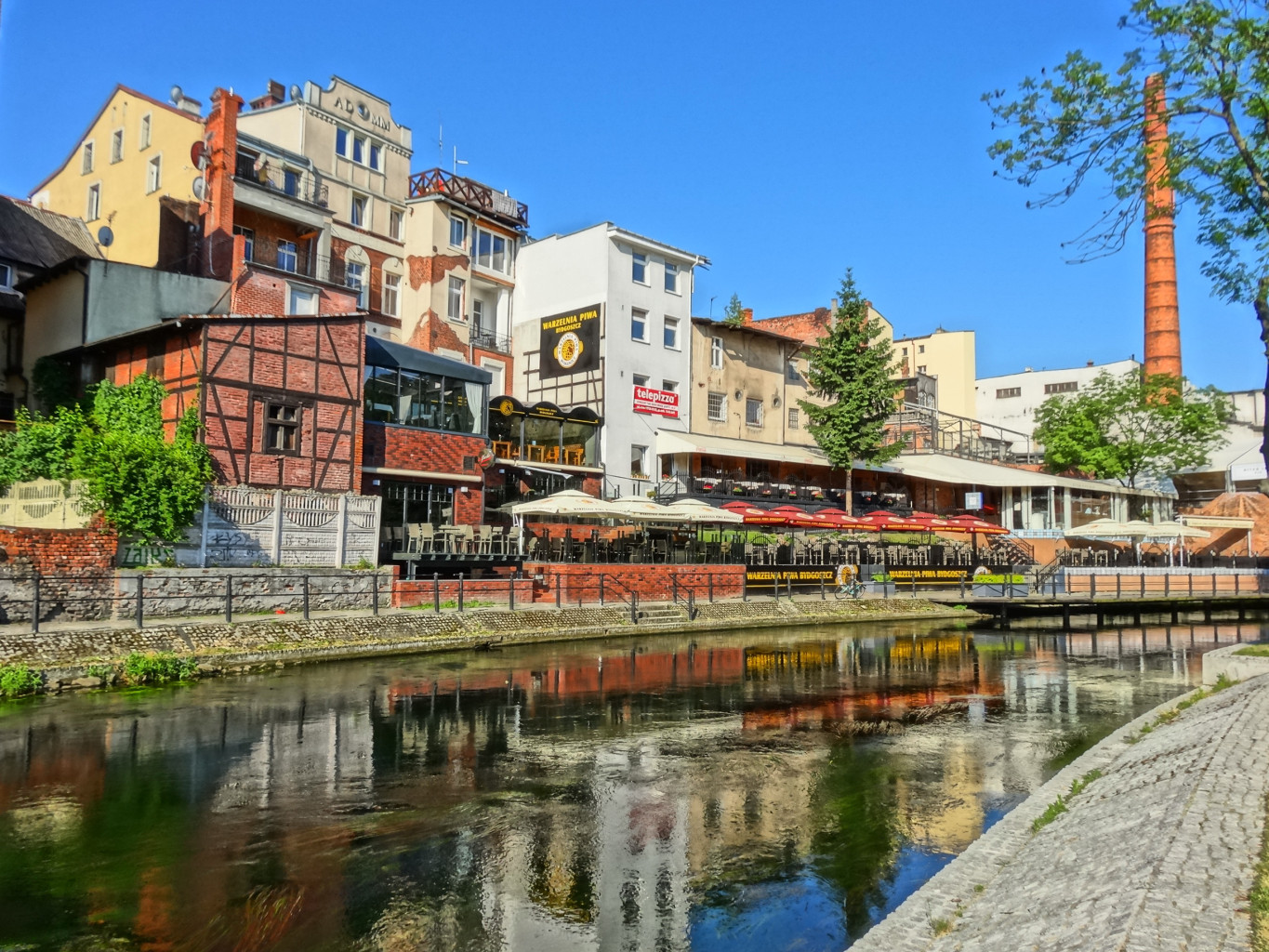
Brewhouse building

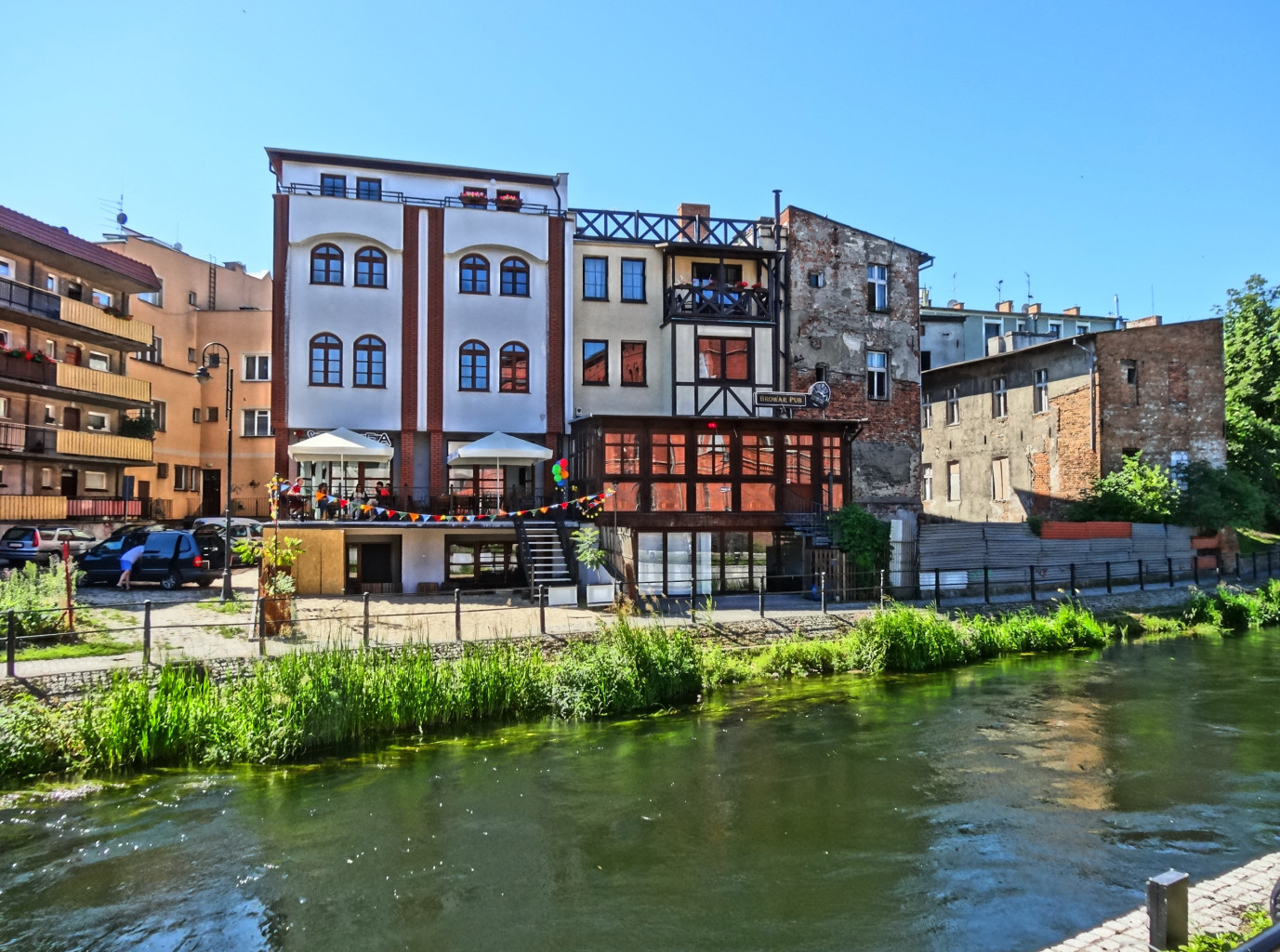
Eastern end

=== Bridges and footbridges ===
Structure	Purposes	Remarks	Picture
Lovers' bridge	Footbridge	Previously (1789-1945), the place of a bridge linking Mill Island warehouses to the royal granaries (Opera Nova's location). It was destroyed during liberation fights in January 1945 of Bydgoszcz and never rebuilt. The actual footbridge is part of the revitalization of Mill Island, it was completed in February 2008.	
Mill Bridge	Road bridge, footbridge	The bridge was built in 1791, during the construction of Rother's Mills. It used to link Eastern Island to Bydgoszcz Old Town, across the leat river. In the 19th and 20th centuries it has been rebuilt several times, till 1964. Last renovation occurred during the revitalization plan of Mill Island until November 2014.	
Venice of Bydgoszcz's footbridge	footbridge	Building of this crossing was part of the revitalization project of Island and has been put into service in September 2006.	
Krzysztof Klenczon footbridge	footbridge	Building of this crossing was part of the revitalization project of Island and has been put into service in February 2008.	
Bridge over the Jaz Ulgowy	Road bridge, footbridge	Bridge over Tamka street on the causeway separating the Brda river from the leat branch	
Pilarski bridge	Road bridge, footbridge	Originally a canal bridge over "Międzywodzie kanal" connecting the main island to the western mint part, its name comes from a sawmill (Polish: piła 'blade'), located in the vicinity of the Red Granary in the 15th century.	
Bridge over "Międzywodzie kanal"	footbridge	This pedestrian bridge exists since the 19th century to lead to Mint island. It has been rebuilt in the 21st century.	
Solidarnośc Mill bridges and Harbour bridges	Road bridge, footbridge, tram	Two series of three bridges over the leat branch.	

=== Revitalisation ===
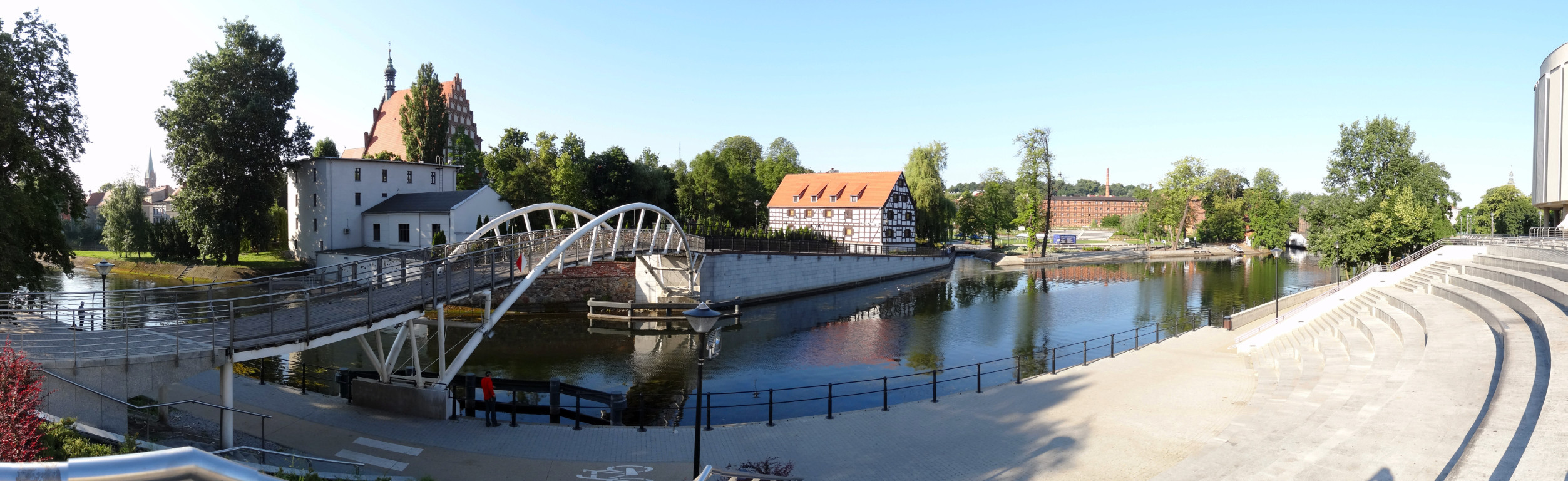
View from the opera, with (from left to right) the hydroplant, the lovers' bridge, the White Granary and Rother's Mills

From 2005 to 2012, Mill Island went through a revitalization process, which was aimed at exposing its cultural, recreational and touristic values.

The cost of the four projects on the island reached nearly 100 million PLN:

- Revitalisation for business developmentplan, performed in 2005 and 2006 with the help of European Union funds. It included the renovation and transformation of Centre for Labour and Entrepreneurship at Mennica St.6, the renovation of quays, the construction of three footbridges and the restoration of "Międzywodzie kanał";
- Renovation of cultural heritage project, realized from 2006 to 2008 with the help of the Norwegian fund. It included the renovation of existing buildings on the island and their transformation for cultural purposes (Museum of Archaeology, Museum of Art, European Money Museum, Leon Wyczółkowski's House;
- Construction of recreational facility performed from 2008 to 2011 with the help of EU funds. It comprised the renovation of Mennica street, the renovation of quays, the construction of alleys and boulevards in a vegetation park, the construction of an amphitheater, a sea sand area and an observation deck with a panoramic view on Bydgoszcz's opera;
- Revitalisation of degraded sporting areas realized between 2010 and 2012 with the help of EU funds. It encompassed the construction of a marina, along with an hotel and a sports marina, the repair of wharves and fish passes.

In addition to these projects, several private investment projects have been run or are planned.

== See also ==
- Regional Museum, Bydgoszcz
- Waterway E70
